This is a partial list of unnumbered minor planets for principal provisional designations assigned during 16–30 September 2003. Since this period yielded a high number of provisional discoveries, it is further split into several standalone pages. , a total of 551 bodies remain unnumbered for this period. Objects for this year are listed on the following pages: A–E · F–G · H–L · M–R · Si · Sii · Siii · Siv · T · Ui · Uii · Uiii · Uiv · V · Wi · Wii and X–Y. Also see previous and next year.

S 

|- id="2003 SW273" bgcolor=#FA8072
| 0 ||  || MCA || 18.2 || data-sort-value="0.68" | 680 m || multiple || 2003–2020 || 14 Dec 2020 || 174 || align=left | Disc.: LINEAR || 
|- id="2003 SE274" bgcolor=#d6d6d6
| 0 ||  || MBA-O || 16.04 || 3.4 km || multiple || 2003–2021 || 18 Apr 2021 || 170 || align=left | Disc.: LONEOSAlt.: 2012 JB44 || 
|- id="2003 SH274" bgcolor=#d6d6d6
| 0 ||  || MBA-O || 17.3 || 1.9 km || multiple || 2003–2021 || 18 Jan 2021 || 106 || align=left | Disc.: LONEOSAlt.: 2014 UM42 || 
|- id="2003 SQ274" bgcolor=#d6d6d6
| 0 ||  || MBA-O || 16.5 || 2.8 km || multiple || 1997–2020 || 17 Oct 2020 || 105 || align=left | Disc.: Spacewatch || 
|- id="2003 SZ274" bgcolor=#E9E9E9
| 3 ||  || MBA-M || 18.9 || data-sort-value="0.92" | 920 m || multiple || 2003–2017 || 08 Dec 2017 || 23 || align=left | Disc.: Spacewatch || 
|- id="2003 SC276" bgcolor=#fefefe
| 3 ||  || MBA-I || 18.8 || data-sort-value="0.52" | 520 m || multiple || 2003–2017 || 21 Nov 2017 || 33 || align=left | Disc.: SpacewatchAlt.: 2010 VJ42 || 
|- id="2003 SN276" bgcolor=#E9E9E9
| 2 ||  || MBA-M || 18.0 || 1.4 km || multiple || 2003–2021 || 06 Oct 2021 || 48 || align=left | Disc.: Spacewatch || 
|- id="2003 SS276" bgcolor=#E9E9E9
| 0 ||  || MBA-M || 17.5 || 1.3 km || multiple || 2003–2020 || 21 Jul 2020 || 54 || align=left | Disc.: SpacewatchAlt.: 2016 NG47 || 
|- id="2003 SE277" bgcolor=#E9E9E9
| 0 ||  || MBA-M || 17.07 || 2.1 km || multiple || 2003–2022 || 07 Jan 2022 || 269 || align=left | Disc.: LINEARAlt.: 2012 TQ211 || 
|- id="2003 SO277" bgcolor=#fefefe
| 0 ||  || MBA-I || 17.8 || data-sort-value="0.82" | 820 m || multiple || 2000–2020 || 26 Dec 2020 || 164 || align=left | Disc.: LINEAR || 
|- id="2003 SC278" bgcolor=#fefefe
| 2 ||  || MBA-I || 18.1 || data-sort-value="0.71" | 710 m || multiple || 2003–2020 || 22 Jun 2020 || 121 || align=left | Disc.: LINEAR || 
|- id="2003 SY278" bgcolor=#fefefe
| 0 ||  || MBA-I || 18.9 || data-sort-value="0.49" | 490 m || multiple || 2003–2021 || 18 Jan 2021 || 35 || align=left | Disc.: SpacewatchAdded on 22 July 2020Alt.: 2013 TE78 || 
|- id="2003 SZ278" bgcolor=#E9E9E9
| 0 ||  || MBA-M || 18.24 || data-sort-value="0.95" | 950 m || multiple || 2003–2021 || 29 Nov 2021 || 62 || align=left | Disc.: LPL/Spacewatch IIAdded on 24 December 2021 || 
|- id="2003 SE279" bgcolor=#E9E9E9
| 1 ||  || MBA-M || 18.22 || 1.3 km || multiple || 2003–2021 || 08 Sep 2021 || 28 || align=left | Disc.: LPL/Spacewatch IIAdded on 19 October 2020 || 
|- id="2003 SF279" bgcolor=#d6d6d6
| 0 ||  || MBA-O || 16.91 || 2.3 km || multiple || 2003–2021 || 14 Aug 2021 || 95 || align=left | Disc.: LPL/Spacewatch IIAdded on 22 July 2020Alt.: 2010 LM83, 2015 FO69 || 
|- id="2003 SK280" bgcolor=#FA8072
| 2 ||  || MCA || 19.1 || data-sort-value="0.45" | 450 m || multiple || 2003–2019 || 17 Dec 2019 || 30 || align=left | Disc.: Spacewatch || 
|- id="2003 SM280" bgcolor=#E9E9E9
| 0 ||  || MBA-M || 17.7 || 1.2 km || multiple || 1999–2020 || 20 Oct 2020 || 140 || align=left | Disc.: NEAT || 
|- id="2003 SS280" bgcolor=#d6d6d6
| 0 ||  || MBA-O || 16.5 || 2.8 km || multiple || 2003–2021 || 08 Jan 2021 || 61 || align=left | Disc.: SpacewatchAlt.: 2014 TO53 || 
|- id="2003 SW280" bgcolor=#E9E9E9
| 0 ||  || MBA-M || 17.85 || 1.1 km || multiple || 2003–2021 || 06 Jan 2021 || 104 || align=left | Disc.: NEAT || 
|- id="2003 SV283" bgcolor=#d6d6d6
| 0 ||  || MBA-O || 17.5 || 1.8 km || multiple || 2003–2020 || 11 Dec 2020 || 77 || align=left | Disc.: LINEARAdded on 17 January 2021Alt.: 2014 NJ42 || 
|- id="2003 SW286" bgcolor=#E9E9E9
| 0 ||  || MBA-M || 17.9 || data-sort-value="0.78" | 780 m || multiple || 2003–2021 || 08 Jan 2021 || 92 || align=left | Disc.: NEATAlt.: 2013 BG40 || 
|- id="2003 SG287" bgcolor=#E9E9E9
| 1 ||  || MBA-M || 19.1 || data-sort-value="0.84" | 840 m || multiple || 2003–2017 || 08 Dec 2017 || 20 || align=left | Disc.: Spacewatch || 
|- id="2003 SJ287" bgcolor=#d6d6d6
| 0 ||  || MBA-O || 17.1 || 2.1 km || multiple || 2001–2019 || 15 Nov 2019 || 64 || align=left | Disc.: SpacewatchAlt.: 2014 SO292 || 
|- id="2003 SM287" bgcolor=#fefefe
| 0 ||  || MBA-I || 18.2 || data-sort-value="0.68" | 680 m || multiple || 2003–2020 || 14 Dec 2020 || 99 || align=left | Disc.: SpacewatchAlt.: 2009 HZ68, 2010 VA156, 2012 FE4, 2015 AU260, 2016 RK13 || 
|- id="2003 SP287" bgcolor=#d6d6d6
| 4 ||  || MBA-O || 18.2 || 1.3 km || multiple || 2003–2019 || 23 Oct 2019 || 22 || align=left | Disc.: LPL/Spacewatch IIAdded on 17 January 2021 || 
|- id="2003 SQ287" bgcolor=#fefefe
| 0 ||  || MBA-I || 19.29 || data-sort-value="0.41" | 410 m || multiple || 2003–2020 || 14 Dec 2020 || 48 || align=left | Disc.: LPL/Spacewatch IIAdded on 17 January 2021Alt.: 2013 PJ52 || 
|- id="2003 SD288" bgcolor=#E9E9E9
| 4 ||  || MBA-M || 19.1 || data-sort-value="0.64" | 640 m || multiple || 2003–2020 || 17 Nov 2020 || 30 || align=left | Disc.: Spacewatch || 
|- id="2003 ST289" bgcolor=#fefefe
| 1 ||  || MBA-I || 18.9 || data-sort-value="0.49" | 490 m || multiple || 2003–2020 || 11 Dec 2020 || 90 || align=left | Disc.: LONEOS || 
|- id="2003 SL290" bgcolor=#E9E9E9
| 0 ||  || MBA-M || 16.9 || 1.8 km || multiple || 2003–2021 || 16 Jan 2021 || 153 || align=left | Disc.: LONEOS || 
|- id="2003 SR290" bgcolor=#fefefe
| 2 ||  || MBA-I || 18.2 || data-sort-value="0.68" | 680 m || multiple || 2003–2018 || 06 Aug 2018 || 34 || align=left | Disc.: LPL/Spacewatch IIAlt.: 2007 VA109 || 
|- id="2003 SM291" bgcolor=#E9E9E9
| 0 ||  || MBA-M || 16.6 || 2.7 km || multiple || 2003–2020 || 26 Apr 2020 || 162 || align=left | Disc.: Junk Bond Obs.Alt.: 2012 QE9 || 
|- id="2003 SF292" bgcolor=#fefefe
| 0 ||  || MBA-I || 17.9 || data-sort-value="0.78" | 780 m || multiple || 2003–2021 || 14 Jan 2021 || 100 || align=left | Disc.: Junk Bond Obs. || 
|- id="2003 SH292" bgcolor=#E9E9E9
| 0 ||  || MBA-M || 17.2 || 1.1 km || multiple || 2003–2021 || 22 Jan 2021 || 94 || align=left | Disc.: NEAT || 
|- id="2003 SQ295" bgcolor=#fefefe
| 1 ||  || MBA-I || 18.1 || data-sort-value="0.71" | 710 m || multiple || 2003–2020 || 26 Jan 2020 || 44 || align=left | Disc.: LONEOS || 
|- id="2003 SR295" bgcolor=#d6d6d6
| 0 ||  || MBA-O || 16.30 || 3.1 km || multiple || 2003–2021 || 03 Apr 2021 || 85 || align=left | Disc.: LONEOS || 
|- id="2003 SU295" bgcolor=#d6d6d6
| 0 ||  || MBA-O || 16.6 || 2.7 km || multiple || 1994–2021 || 18 Jan 2021 || 125 || align=left | Disc.: LONEOSAlt.: 2014 WO301 || 
|- id="2003 SQ298" bgcolor=#E9E9E9
| 1 ||  || MBA-M || 17.2 || 1.5 km || multiple || 2003–2020 || 06 Dec 2020 || 282 || align=left | Disc.: AMOS || 
|- id="2003 SN300" bgcolor=#E9E9E9
| 0 ||  || MBA-M || 17.0 || 1.2 km || multiple || 2003–2020 || 17 Dec 2020 || 143 || align=left | Disc.: NEATAlt.: 2012 XD58 || 
|- id="2003 SS300" bgcolor=#d6d6d6
| 0 ||  || MBA-O || 16.42 || 2.9 km || multiple || 2003–2021 || 08 Apr 2021 || 217 || align=left | Disc.: NEATAlt.: 2014 UJ94 || 
|- id="2003 SU301" bgcolor=#d6d6d6
| 0 ||  || MBA-O || 16.6 || 2.7 km || multiple || 2003–2020 || 16 Nov 2020 || 89 || align=left | Disc.: NEATAlt.: 2014 SX140 || 
|- id="2003 SF302" bgcolor=#E9E9E9
| 2 ||  || MBA-M || 17.8 || data-sort-value="0.82" | 820 m || multiple || 2003–2012 || 23 Dec 2012 || 22 || align=left | Disc.: NEATAlt.: 2011 OR54 || 
|- id="2003 SM302" bgcolor=#d6d6d6
| 0 ||  || MBA-O || 17.0 || 2.2 km || multiple || 2003–2018 || 21 Jun 2018 || 63 || align=left | Disc.: NEATAlt.: 2008 QA33 || 
|- id="2003 SQ302" bgcolor=#d6d6d6
| 0 ||  || MBA-O || 16.86 || 2.4 km || multiple || 2003–2022 || 07 Jan 2022 || 50 || align=left | Disc.: NEATAlt.: 2014 QH375 || 
|- id="2003 SZ302" bgcolor=#fefefe
| 0 ||  || MBA-I || 18.1 || data-sort-value="0.71" | 710 m || multiple || 2003–2020 || 19 Jan 2020 || 138 || align=left | Disc.: NEAT || 
|- id="2003 SZ306" bgcolor=#d6d6d6
| 0 ||  || MBA-O || 16.8 || 2.3 km || multiple || 2003–2021 || 16 Jan 2021 || 91 || align=left | Disc.: LPL/Spacewatch IIAlt.: 2010 DC85 || 
|- id="2003 SB307" bgcolor=#d6d6d6
| 0 ||  || MBA-O || 17.26 || 2.0 km || multiple || 2003–2022 || 07 Jan 2022 || 94 || align=left | Disc.: LPL/Spacewatch IIAlt.: 2010 CU241 || 
|- id="2003 SP307" bgcolor=#fefefe
| 3 ||  || MBA-I || 18.4 || data-sort-value="0.62" | 620 m || multiple || 2003–2014 || 01 Oct 2014 || 53 || align=left | Disc.: LINEARAlt.: 2014 QC19 || 
|- id="2003 SV309" bgcolor=#fefefe
| 0 ||  || MBA-I || 18.3 || data-sort-value="0.65" | 650 m || multiple || 2003–2020 || 17 Dec 2020 || 124 || align=left | Disc.: SpacewatchAlt.: 2015 BE343 || 
|- id="2003 SW309" bgcolor=#d6d6d6
| 0 ||  || MBA-O || 16.4 || 2.9 km || multiple || 1992–2021 || 14 Jan 2021 || 186 || align=left | Disc.: Desert Eagle Obs. || 
|- id="2003 SM310" bgcolor=#E9E9E9
| 1 ||  || MBA-M || 17.4 || data-sort-value="0.98" | 980 m || multiple || 2003–2021 || 02 Jan 2021 || 55 || align=left | Disc.: LINEAR || 
|- id="2003 SV310" bgcolor=#E9E9E9
| 1 ||  || MBA-M || 18.4 || data-sort-value="0.88" | 880 m || multiple || 2003–2020 || 16 Nov 2020 || 99 || align=left | Disc.: LINEARAlt.: 2016 TH130 || 
|- id="2003 SW310" bgcolor=#d6d6d6
| 0 ||  || HIL || 15.2 || 5.1 km || multiple || 1995–2021 || 16 Jan 2021 || 236 || align=left | Disc.: LINEAR || 
|- id="2003 SL311" bgcolor=#d6d6d6
| 0 ||  || MBA-O || 16.60 || 2.7 km || multiple || 2001–2022 || 27 Jan 2022 || 116 || align=left | Disc.: LINEARAlt.: 2014 RL35 || 
|- id="2003 SN312" bgcolor=#E9E9E9
| 1 ||  || MBA-M || 17.5 || data-sort-value="0.94" | 940 m || multiple || 1995–2021 || 11 Jan 2021 || 123 || align=left | Disc.: LONEOSAlt.: 2011 RZ16 || 
|- id="2003 ST312" bgcolor=#fefefe
| 0 ||  || MBA-I || 17.87 || data-sort-value="0.79" | 790 m || multiple || 2003–2022 || 27 Jan 2022 || 183 || align=left | Disc.: NEAT || 
|- id="2003 SD313" bgcolor=#fefefe
| 0 ||  || MBA-I || 17.4 || data-sort-value="0.98" | 980 m || multiple || 2003–2021 || 16 Jan 2021 || 108 || align=left | Disc.: LINEAR || 
|- id="2003 SO313" bgcolor=#E9E9E9
| 0 ||  || MBA-M || 17.2 || 1.1 km || multiple || 2003–2021 || 12 Jan 2021 || 138 || align=left | Disc.: NEAT || 
|- id="2003 SY314" bgcolor=#d6d6d6
| – ||  || MBA-O || 17.2 || 2.0 km || single || 12 days || 28 Sep 2003 || 15 || align=left | Disc.: LINEAR || 
|- id="2003 SH315" bgcolor=#E9E9E9
| 0 ||  || MBA-M || 16.8 || 1.8 km || multiple || 1998–2020 || 22 Jul 2020 || 98 || align=left | Disc.: LONEOS || 
|- id="2003 SJ315" bgcolor=#E9E9E9
| 0 ||  || MBA-M || 17.33 || 1.0 km || multiple || 2003–2021 || 17 Apr 2021 || 123 || align=left | Disc.: LONEOSAlt.: 2011 SC271 || 
|- id="2003 SO316" bgcolor=#d6d6d6
| 0 ||  || MBA-O || 17.1 || 2.1 km || multiple || 2003–2020 || 13 Sep 2020 || 29 || align=left | Disc.: LPL/Spacewatch IIAdded on 17 January 2021 || 
|- id="2003 SK317" bgcolor=#d6d6d6
| 0 ||  || MBA-O || 17.9 || 1.5 km || multiple || 2000–2019 || 23 Oct 2019 || 40 || align=left | Disc.: Spacewatch || 
|- id="2003 SN317" bgcolor=#C2E0FF
| 2 ||  || TNO || 6.5 || 167 km || multiple || 2000–2008 || 30 Nov 2008 || 36 || align=left | Disc.: Mauna Kea Obs.LoUTNOs, cubewano (cold) || 
|- id="2003 SO317" bgcolor=#C2E0FF
| 3 ||  || TNO || 8.12 || 112 km || multiple || 2001–2021 || 05 Nov 2021 || 39 || align=left | Disc.: Mauna Kea Obs.LoUTNOs, plutino || 
|- id="2003 SQ317" bgcolor=#C2E0FF
| 2 ||  || TNO || 6.69 || 92 km || multiple || 2002–2020 || 13 Sep 2020 || 156 || align=left | Disc.: Mauna Kea Obs.LoUTNOs, Haumea, BR-mag: 1.05; suspected binary || 
|- id="2003 SR317" bgcolor=#C2E0FF
| 2 ||  || TNO || 7.7 || 136 km || multiple || 2003–2015 || 17 Jan 2015 || 53 || align=left | Disc.: Mauna Kea Obs.LoUTNOs, plutino || 
|- id="2003 SS318" bgcolor=#d6d6d6
| 0 ||  || MBA-O || 17.2 || 2.0 km || multiple || 2003–2020 || 10 Dec 2020 || 51 || align=left | Disc.: Spacewatch || 
|- id="2003 SL319" bgcolor=#fefefe
| 1 ||  || MBA-I || 18.6 || data-sort-value="0.57" | 570 m || multiple || 2003–2020 || 24 Jan 2020 || 86 || align=left | Disc.: NEATAlt.: 2006 QO57 || 
|- id="2003 SW322" bgcolor=#E9E9E9
| 0 ||  || MBA-M || 16.8 || 1.3 km || multiple || 2003–2021 || 06 Jan 2021 || 107 || align=left | Disc.: Spacewatch || 
|- id="2003 SX322" bgcolor=#fefefe
| 0 ||  || MBA-I || 18.4 || data-sort-value="0.62" | 620 m || multiple || 2003–2020 || 08 Oct 2020 || 46 || align=left | Disc.: Spacewatch || 
|- id="2003 SG323" bgcolor=#fefefe
| 1 ||  || MBA-I || 19.35 || data-sort-value="0.40" | 400 m || multiple || 2003–2019 || 24 Dec 2019 || 28 || align=left | Disc.: Spacewatch || 
|- id="2003 SH323" bgcolor=#fefefe
| 0 ||  || MBA-I || 18.3 || data-sort-value="0.65" | 650 m || multiple || 2003–2016 || 04 Sep 2016 || 52 || align=left | Disc.: Spacewatch || 
|- id="2003 SJ323" bgcolor=#fefefe
| 0 ||  || MBA-I || 18.9 || data-sort-value="0.49" | 490 m || multiple || 2003–2021 || 18 Jan 2021 || 58 || align=left | Disc.: Spacewatch || 
|- id="2003 SN323" bgcolor=#E9E9E9
| 0 ||  || MBA-M || 18.39 || data-sort-value="0.88" | 880 m || multiple || 1999–2022 || 27 Jan 2022 || 157 || align=left | Disc.: Spacewatch || 
|- id="2003 SP323" bgcolor=#d6d6d6
| 0 ||  || MBA-O || 16.8 || 2.4 km || multiple || 2003–2020 || 18 Dec 2020 || 97 || align=left | Disc.: Spacewatch || 
|- id="2003 SS323" bgcolor=#fefefe
| 0 ||  || MBA-I || 17.84 || data-sort-value="0.80" | 800 m || multiple || 2003–2021 || 03 May 2021 || 91 || align=left | Disc.: SpacewatchAlt.: 2011 UN98 || 
|- id="2003 SW323" bgcolor=#E9E9E9
| – ||  || MBA-M || 19.2 || data-sort-value="0.61" | 610 m || single || 38 days || 24 Oct 2003 || 16 || align=left | Disc.: Spacewatch || 
|- id="2003 SY323" bgcolor=#d6d6d6
| 0 ||  || MBA-O || 17.3 || 1.9 km || multiple || 2003–2020 || 17 Nov 2020 || 78 || align=left | Disc.: LPL/Spacewatch IIAlt.: 2014 QS359 || 
|- id="2003 SJ324" bgcolor=#E9E9E9
| 0 ||  || MBA-M || 17.7 || 1.2 km || multiple || 1999–2020 || 12 Dec 2020 || 125 || align=left | Disc.: Spacewatch || 
|- id="2003 SV324" bgcolor=#fefefe
| 0 ||  || MBA-I || 18.7 || data-sort-value="0.54" | 540 m || multiple || 2003–2019 || 24 Aug 2019 || 78 || align=left | Disc.: Spacewatch || 
|- id="2003 SX324" bgcolor=#fefefe
| 1 ||  || MBA-I || 18.4 || data-sort-value="0.62" | 620 m || multiple || 2000–2020 || 10 Dec 2020 || 84 || align=left | Disc.: NEAT || 
|- id="2003 SA325" bgcolor=#E9E9E9
| 0 ||  || MBA-M || 17.55 || 1.7 km || multiple || 2003–2021 || 17 Jul 2021 || 71 || align=left | Disc.: SpacewatchAlt.: 2008 UA29 || 
|- id="2003 SC325" bgcolor=#E9E9E9
| 0 ||  || MBA-M || 17.3 || 1.0 km || multiple || 1995–2020 || 14 Dec 2020 || 47 || align=left | Disc.: Spacewatch || 
|- id="2003 SF325" bgcolor=#E9E9E9
| 1 ||  || MBA-M || 18.62 || data-sort-value="0.79" | 790 m || multiple || 2003–2021 || 28 Nov 2021 || 44 || align=left | Disc.: SpacewatchAlt.: 2012 TK120 || 
|- id="2003 SH325" bgcolor=#fefefe
| – ||  || MBA-I || 19.5 || data-sort-value="0.37" | 370 m || single || 12 days || 29 Sep 2003 || 13 || align=left | Disc.: Spacewatch || 
|- id="2003 SQ325" bgcolor=#E9E9E9
| 0 ||  || MBA-M || 18.2 || data-sort-value="0.68" | 680 m || multiple || 2003–2021 || 10 Jan 2021 || 40 || align=left | Disc.: NEAT || 
|- id="2003 SR325" bgcolor=#fefefe
| 0 ||  || MBA-I || 18.3 || data-sort-value="0.65" | 650 m || multiple || 2003–2019 || 15 Nov 2019 || 169 || align=left | Disc.: NEAT || 
|- id="2003 SA326" bgcolor=#fefefe
| 0 ||  || MBA-I || 18.4 || data-sort-value="0.62" | 620 m || multiple || 2003–2020 || 14 Aug 2020 || 59 || align=left | Disc.: NEAT || 
|- id="2003 SF326" bgcolor=#FA8072
| 1 ||  || MCA || 18.3 || data-sort-value="0.65" | 650 m || multiple || 2003–2020 || 20 Jan 2020 || 224 || align=left | Disc.: NEAT || 
|- id="2003 SH326" bgcolor=#d6d6d6
| 0 ||  || MBA-O || 17.4 || 1.8 km || multiple || 1998–2021 || 08 Jan 2021 || 83 || align=left | Disc.: SpacewatchAlt.: 2014 UC45 || 
|- id="2003 SK326" bgcolor=#d6d6d6
| – ||  || MBA-O || 17.1 || 2.1 km || single || 31 days || 19 Oct 2003 || 12 || align=left | Disc.: Spacewatch || 
|- id="2003 SR326" bgcolor=#fefefe
| 0 ||  || MBA-I || 18.7 || data-sort-value="0.54" | 540 m || multiple || 2003–2020 || 19 Oct 2020 || 101 || align=left | Disc.: SpacewatchAlt.: 2016 GL136 || 
|- id="2003 SU326" bgcolor=#d6d6d6
| 0 ||  || HIL || 16.6 || 2.7 km || multiple || 2003–2020 || 24 Dec 2020 || 47 || align=left | Disc.: Spacewatch || 
|- id="2003 SV326" bgcolor=#d6d6d6
| 0 ||  || MBA-O || 17.4 || 1.8 km || multiple || 2003–2021 || 06 Jan 2021 || 66 || align=left | Disc.: SpacewatchAlt.: 2014 VA7 || 
|- id="2003 SA327" bgcolor=#E9E9E9
| 0 ||  || MBA-M || 18.92 || data-sort-value="0.92" | 920 m || multiple || 2003–2021 || 24 Oct 2021 || 67 || align=left | Disc.: Spacewatch || 
|- id="2003 SC327" bgcolor=#fefefe
| 0 ||  || MBA-I || 18.5 || data-sort-value="0.59" | 590 m || multiple || 2003–2019 || 25 Sep 2019 || 102 || align=left | Disc.: SpacewatchAlt.: 2016 UN27 || 
|- id="2003 SD327" bgcolor=#E9E9E9
| 1 ||  || MBA-M || 18.07 || 1.4 km || multiple || 2003–2021 || 30 Oct 2021 || 58 || align=left | Disc.: SpacewatchAlt.: 2012 TE175 || 
|- id="2003 SH327" bgcolor=#E9E9E9
| – ||  || MBA-M || 18.6 || data-sort-value="0.57" | 570 m || single || 35 days || 23 Oct 2003 || 11 || align=left | Disc.: Spacewatch || 
|- id="2003 SS327" bgcolor=#E9E9E9
| 0 ||  || MBA-M || 17.5 || data-sort-value="0.94" | 940 m || multiple || 2003–2021 || 08 Jan 2021 || 62 || align=left | Disc.: NEAT || 
|- id="2003 ST327" bgcolor=#d6d6d6
| 0 ||  || MBA-O || 16.41 || 2.9 km || multiple || 2003–2021 || 01 Apr 2021 || 252 || align=left | Disc.: NEAT || 
|- id="2003 SJ328" bgcolor=#fefefe
| 0 ||  || MBA-I || 18.23 || data-sort-value="0.67" | 670 m || multiple || 2003–2021 || 16 May 2021 || 150 || align=left | Disc.: LPL/Spacewatch II || 
|- id="2003 SN328" bgcolor=#fefefe
| – ||  || MBA-I || 18.3 || data-sort-value="0.65" | 650 m || single || 29 days || 20 Oct 2003 || 20 || align=left | Disc.: LONEOS || 
|- id="2003 ST328" bgcolor=#fefefe
| 0 ||  || MBA-I || 18.55 || data-sort-value="0.58" | 580 m || multiple || 2003–2021 || 31 Oct 2021 || 138 || align=left | Disc.: Spacewatch || 
|- id="2003 SX328" bgcolor=#E9E9E9
| 0 ||  || MBA-M || 18.1 || 1.0 km || multiple || 2003–2020 || 10 Dec 2020 || 79 || align=left | Disc.: Spacewatch || 
|- id="2003 SF329" bgcolor=#fefefe
| 2 ||  || MBA-I || 18.4 || data-sort-value="0.62" | 620 m || multiple || 2003–2018 || 12 Jul 2018 || 40 || align=left | Disc.: LONEOS || 
|- id="2003 SG329" bgcolor=#fefefe
| 0 ||  || MBA-I || 18.1 || data-sort-value="0.71" | 710 m || multiple || 2003–2020 || 26 Jan 2020 || 59 || align=left | Disc.: LONEOS || 
|- id="2003 SQ329" bgcolor=#E9E9E9
| 0 ||  || MBA-M || 18.56 || 1.1 km || multiple || 2003–2021 || 27 Oct 2021 || 96 || align=left | Disc.: LPL/Spacewatch II || 
|- id="2003 SU329" bgcolor=#fefefe
| 0 ||  || MBA-I || 17.9 || data-sort-value="0.78" | 780 m || multiple || 2003–2020 || 20 Dec 2020 || 168 || align=left | Disc.: NEAT || 
|- id="2003 SV329" bgcolor=#E9E9E9
| 0 ||  || MBA-M || 17.7 || 1.2 km || multiple || 2003–2021 || 12 Jan 2021 || 233 || align=left | Disc.: NEAT || 
|- id="2003 SW329" bgcolor=#E9E9E9
| 0 ||  || MBA-M || 17.9 || 1.1 km || multiple || 2003–2016 || 25 Sep 2016 || 30 || align=left | Disc.: NEAT || 
|- id="2003 SN330" bgcolor=#d6d6d6
| 0 ||  || MBA-O || 17.0 || 2.2 km || multiple || 2003–2020 || 15 Dec 2020 || 77 || align=left | Disc.: SDSSAlt.: 2009 VQ5 || 
|- id="2003 SQ330" bgcolor=#fefefe
| 2 ||  || MBA-I || 19.2 || data-sort-value="0.43" | 430 m || multiple || 2003–2016 || 27 Dec 2016 || 27 || align=left | Disc.: SDSS || 
|- id="2003 SR330" bgcolor=#E9E9E9
| 1 ||  || MBA-M || 18.3 || data-sort-value="0.65" | 650 m || multiple || 2003–2019 || 28 Aug 2019 || 38 || align=left | Disc.: SDSS || 
|- id="2003 SS330" bgcolor=#d6d6d6
| 0 ||  || MBA-O || 16.8 || 2.4 km || multiple || 2003–2019 || 24 Oct 2019 || 48 || align=left | Disc.: SDSS || 
|- id="2003 ST330" bgcolor=#d6d6d6
| 0 ||  || MBA-O || 17.0 || 2.2 km || multiple || 2003–2020 || 17 Nov 2020 || 41 || align=left | Disc.: SDSS || 
|- id="2003 SV330" bgcolor=#E9E9E9
| 1 ||  || MBA-M || 18.7 || data-sort-value="0.76" | 760 m || multiple || 2003–2020 || 14 Oct 2020 || 58 || align=left | Disc.: SDSS || 
|- id="2003 SY330" bgcolor=#fefefe
| 1 ||  || MBA-I || 18.8 || data-sort-value="0.52" | 520 m || multiple || 2003–2017 || 17 Nov 2017 || 102 || align=left | Disc.: SDSSAlt.: 2010 MK24 || 
|- id="2003 SZ330" bgcolor=#d6d6d6
| 0 ||  || MBA-O || 16.8 || 2.4 km || multiple || 2003–2019 || 28 Nov 2019 || 66 || align=left | Disc.: SDSSAlt.: 2014 WC104 || 
|- id="2003 SA331" bgcolor=#d6d6d6
| 1 ||  || MBA-O || 17.9 || 1.5 km || multiple || 2003–2020 || 23 Dec 2020 || 38 || align=left | Disc.: SDSSAlt.: 2014 XD20 || 
|- id="2003 SE331" bgcolor=#d6d6d6
| 0 ||  || MBA-O || 16.89 || 2.3 km || multiple || 2003–2021 || 17 Apr 2021 || 52 || align=left | Disc.: SDSS || 
|- id="2003 SG331" bgcolor=#E9E9E9
| 0 ||  || MBA-M || 16.5 || 2.8 km || multiple || 2003–2020 || 27 Apr 2020 || 177 || align=left | Disc.: SDSS || 
|- id="2003 SP331" bgcolor=#d6d6d6
| 0 ||  || MBA-O || 16.8 || 2.4 km || multiple || 2003–2020 || 14 Dec 2020 || 94 || align=left | Disc.: Spacewatch || 
|- id="2003 SX331" bgcolor=#d6d6d6
| 0 ||  || MBA-O || 16.3 || 3.1 km || multiple || 2003–2021 || 17 Jan 2021 || 123 || align=left | Disc.: SDSSAlt.: 2014 WL234 || 
|- id="2003 SY331" bgcolor=#fefefe
| 0 ||  || MBA-I || 19.01 || data-sort-value="0.47" | 470 m || multiple || 2003–2021 || 02 Oct 2021 || 37 || align=left | Disc.: SDSSAlt.: 2014 WJ87 || 
|- id="2003 SA332" bgcolor=#d6d6d6
| 0 ||  || MBA-O || 16.9 || 2.3 km || multiple || 2003–2020 || 11 Dec 2020 || 56 || align=left | Disc.: SDSS || 
|- id="2003 SQ332" bgcolor=#E9E9E9
| 0 ||  || MBA-M || 17.17 || 2.0 km || multiple || 2003–2021 || 06 Dec 2021 || 231 || align=left | Disc.: SDSSAlt.: 2012 QF15 || 
|- id="2003 ST332" bgcolor=#E9E9E9
| 0 ||  || MBA-M || 17.9 || 1.1 km || multiple || 1999–2020 || 16 Oct 2020 || 124 || align=left | Disc.: SpacewatchAlt.: 1999 VE231, 2012 VV83 || 
|- id="2003 SU332" bgcolor=#fefefe
| – ||  || MBA-I || 17.8 || data-sort-value="0.82" | 820 m || single || 25 days || 24 Oct 2003 || 13 || align=left | Disc.: Spacewatch || 
|- id="2003 SV332" bgcolor=#d6d6d6
| 0 ||  || HIL || 16.6 || 2.7 km || multiple || 1995–2019 || 08 Nov 2019 || 66 || align=left | Disc.: SpacewatchAlt.: 2011 UL222 || 
|- id="2003 SQ333" bgcolor=#fefefe
| 0 ||  || MBA-I || 19.31 || data-sort-value="0.41" | 410 m || multiple || 2003–2021 || 09 Dec 2021 || 60 || align=left | Disc.: SDSS || 
|- id="2003 SV333" bgcolor=#FA8072
| 0 ||  || MCA || 18.80 || data-sort-value="0.52" | 520 m || multiple || 2003–2019 || 24 Jul 2019 || 91 || align=left | Disc.: SDSS || 
|- id="2003 SY333" bgcolor=#E9E9E9
| 1 ||  || MBA-M || 18.0 || data-sort-value="0.75" | 750 m || multiple || 2003–2019 || 20 Aug 2019 || 46 || align=left | Disc.: SDSS || 
|- id="2003 SB334" bgcolor=#fefefe
| 0 ||  || MBA-I || 18.7 || data-sort-value="0.54" | 540 m || multiple || 2003–2020 || 11 Oct 2020 || 81 || align=left | Disc.: Spacewatch || 
|- id="2003 SM334" bgcolor=#d6d6d6
| 0 ||  || MBA-O || 17.08 || 2.1 km || multiple || 2003–2021 || 30 Nov 2021 || 85 || align=left | Disc.: SDSSAlt.: 2014 OB185 || 
|- id="2003 SO334" bgcolor=#d6d6d6
| 0 ||  || MBA-O || 16.8 || 2.4 km || multiple || 2003–2019 || 01 Nov 2019 || 78 || align=left | Disc.: SDSSAlt.: 2017 FX112 || 
|- id="2003 SP334" bgcolor=#E9E9E9
| 0 ||  || MBA-M || 18.3 || data-sort-value="0.92" | 920 m || multiple || 2003–2020 || 15 Jun 2020 || 36 || align=left | Disc.: SDSSAlt.: 2012 UL80 || 
|- id="2003 SQ334" bgcolor=#d6d6d6
| 0 ||  || MBA-O || 16.1 || 3.4 km || multiple || 2003–2021 || 03 Jan 2021 || 136 || align=left | Disc.: SDSSAlt.: 2014 TS7 || 
|- id="2003 SR334" bgcolor=#E9E9E9
| 0 ||  || MBA-M || 17.9 || data-sort-value="0.78" | 780 m || multiple || 1995–2019 || 03 Oct 2019 || 59 || align=left | Disc.: SDSS || 
|- id="2003 SS334" bgcolor=#d6d6d6
| 0 ||  || MBA-O || 17.0 || 2.2 km || multiple || 2003–2020 || 25 Jan 2020 || 138 || align=left | Disc.: SDSSAlt.: 2010 JC18 || 
|- id="2003 SV334" bgcolor=#fefefe
| 0 ||  || MBA-I || 18.0 || data-sort-value="0.75" | 750 m || multiple || 2003–2020 || 23 Jun 2020 || 82 || align=left | Disc.: SDSS || 
|- id="2003 SW334" bgcolor=#d6d6d6
| 0 ||  || MBA-O || 16.51 || 2.8 km || multiple || 2003–2022 || 27 Jan 2022 || 109 || align=left | Disc.: SDSS || 
|- id="2003 SZ334" bgcolor=#d6d6d6
| 0 ||  || MBA-O || 16.4 || 2.9 km || multiple || 2003–2021 || 17 Jan 2021 || 134 || align=left | Disc.: SDSSAlt.: 2014 UJ199 || 
|- id="2003 SC335" bgcolor=#E9E9E9
| 0 ||  || MBA-M || 17.94 || 1.4 km || multiple || 2003–2021 || 06 Nov 2021 || 63 || align=left | Disc.: SDSS || 
|- id="2003 SH335" bgcolor=#E9E9E9
| 0 ||  || MBA-M || 17.67 || 1.6 km || multiple || 2003–2021 || 28 Oct 2021 || 33 || align=left | Disc.: SDSSAlt.: 2021 PW98 || 
|- id="2003 SN335" bgcolor=#E9E9E9
| 0 ||  || MBA-M || 17.23 || 1.5 km || multiple || 2003–2021 || 30 Nov 2021 || 131 || align=left | Disc.: SDSS || 
|- id="2003 SR335" bgcolor=#fefefe
| – ||  || MBA-I || 19.2 || data-sort-value="0.43" | 430 m || single || 55 days || 20 Nov 2003 || 13 || align=left | Disc.: SDSS || 
|- id="2003 ST335" bgcolor=#E9E9E9
| 0 ||  || MBA-M || 18.6 || data-sort-value="0.80" | 800 m || multiple || 2000–2020 || 20 Oct 2020 || 64 || align=left | Disc.: SDSS || 
|- id="2003 SU335" bgcolor=#fefefe
| 0 ||  || MBA-I || 17.5 || data-sort-value="0.94" | 940 m || multiple || 2003–2020 || 11 May 2020 || 143 || align=left | Disc.: SDSS || 
|- id="2003 SW335" bgcolor=#FA8072
| 0 ||  || MCA || 20.0 || data-sort-value="0.30" | 300 m || multiple || 2003–2020 || 10 Dec 2020 || 53 || align=left | Disc.: SDSSAlt.: 2010 XE87 || 
|- id="2003 SZ335" bgcolor=#d6d6d6
| 0 ||  || MBA-O || 16.7 || 2.5 km || multiple || 2003–2021 || 18 Jan 2021 || 135 || align=left | Disc.: SDSSAlt.: 2014 SX208 || 
|- id="2003 SB336" bgcolor=#E9E9E9
| 0 ||  || MBA-M || 19.0 || data-sort-value="0.67" | 670 m || multiple || 2003–2021 || 03 Jan 2021 || 86 || align=left | Disc.: SDSS || 
|- id="2003 SE336" bgcolor=#E9E9E9
| 0 ||  || MBA-M || 17.52 || 1.7 km || multiple || 2003–2021 || 02 Dec 2021 || 59 || align=left | Disc.: SDSS || 
|- id="2003 SG336" bgcolor=#E9E9E9
| 0 ||  || MBA-M || 17.79 || 1.5 km || multiple || 2003–2021 || 02 Dec 2021 || 87 || align=left | Disc.: SDSSAlt.: 2015 FX11 || 
|- id="2003 SJ336" bgcolor=#E9E9E9
| 0 ||  || MBA-M || 17.10 || 1.6 km || multiple || 2003–2021 || 12 Jan 2021 || 51 || align=left | Disc.: SDSS || 
|- id="2003 SL336" bgcolor=#fefefe
| 0 ||  || MBA-I || 18.78 || data-sort-value="0.52" | 520 m || multiple || 2003–2021 || 09 Aug 2021 || 40 || align=left | Disc.: SpacewatchAlt.: 2012 CX49 || 
|- id="2003 SO336" bgcolor=#E9E9E9
| 0 ||  || MBA-M || 18.0 || 1.1 km || multiple || 2003–2021 || 16 Jan 2021 || 87 || align=left | Disc.: SDSS || 
|- id="2003 SP336" bgcolor=#fefefe
| 0 ||  || MBA-I || 18.8 || data-sort-value="0.52" | 520 m || multiple || 2003–2020 || 10 Dec 2020 || 79 || align=left | Disc.: SDSS || 
|- id="2003 SQ336" bgcolor=#d6d6d6
| 0 ||  || MBA-O || 16.88 || 2.3 km || multiple || 1993–2021 || 15 Apr 2021 || 73 || align=left | Disc.: SDSS || 
|- id="2003 SR336" bgcolor=#E9E9E9
| 0 ||  || MBA-M || 17.5 || 1.3 km || multiple || 2003–2020 || 17 Nov 2020 || 103 || align=left | Disc.: SDSS || 
|- id="2003 SS336" bgcolor=#E9E9E9
| 0 ||  || MBA-M || 17.61 || 1.7 km || multiple || 2003–2021 || 27 Nov 2021 || 72 || align=left | Disc.: SDSS || 
|- id="2003 SV336" bgcolor=#fefefe
| – ||  || MBA-I || 19.8 || data-sort-value="0.33" | 330 m || single || 54 days || 20 Nov 2003 || 10 || align=left | Disc.: SDSS || 
|- id="2003 SW336" bgcolor=#fefefe
| 0 ||  || MBA-I || 18.3 || data-sort-value="0.65" | 650 m || multiple || 2003–2021 || 17 Jan 2021 || 46 || align=left | Disc.: SDSS || 
|- id="2003 SX336" bgcolor=#d6d6d6
| 0 ||  || HIL || 16.1 || 3.4 km || multiple || 2003–2019 || 24 Dec 2019 || 45 || align=left | Disc.: SDSS || 
|- id="2003 SY336" bgcolor=#E9E9E9
| 0 ||  || MBA-M || 17.20 || 2.0 km || multiple || 2003–2021 || 30 Nov 2021 || 137 || align=left | Disc.: SDSS || 
|- id="2003 SB337" bgcolor=#fefefe
| 0 ||  || MBA-I || 18.10 || data-sort-value="0.71" | 710 m || multiple || 2003–2021 || 15 Apr 2021 || 47 || align=left | Disc.: SDSSAlt.: 2011 UW276 || 
|- id="2003 SE337" bgcolor=#d6d6d6
| 0 ||  || MBA-O || 18.1 || 1.3 km || multiple || 2003–2020 || 09 Dec 2020 || 31 || align=left | Disc.: SDSS || 
|- id="2003 SF337" bgcolor=#E9E9E9
| 0 ||  || MBA-M || 17.81 || 1.2 km || multiple || 2003–2021 || 30 Nov 2021 || 104 || align=left | Disc.: SDSS || 
|- id="2003 SG337" bgcolor=#E9E9E9
| 0 ||  || MBA-M || 17.11 || 1.6 km || multiple || 2003–2022 || 25 Jan 2022 || 158 || align=left | Disc.: SDSS || 
|- id="2003 SH337" bgcolor=#d6d6d6
| 0 ||  || MBA-O || 17.4 || 1.8 km || multiple || 2003–2020 || 24 Dec 2020 || 87 || align=left | Disc.: SDSSAlt.: 2014 UK163 || 
|- id="2003 SJ337" bgcolor=#E9E9E9
| 0 ||  || MBA-M || 17.8 || data-sort-value="0.82" | 820 m || multiple || 2003–2019 || 24 Aug 2019 || 49 || align=left | Disc.: SDSS || 
|- id="2003 SL338" bgcolor=#fefefe
| 0 ||  || MBA-I || 18.72 || data-sort-value="0.54" | 540 m || multiple || 2003–2021 || 07 Sep 2021 || 26 || align=left | Disc.: SDSS || 
|- id="2003 SP338" bgcolor=#E9E9E9
| 0 ||  || MBA-M || 17.59 || 1.7 km || multiple || 2003–2021 || 27 Nov 2021 || 134 || align=left | Disc.: SDSS || 
|- id="2003 SQ338" bgcolor=#d6d6d6
| 0 ||  || MBA-O || 16.7 || 2.5 km || multiple || 2003–2020 || 22 Dec 2020 || 64 || align=left | Disc.: SDSSAlt.: 2017 HC30 || 
|- id="2003 SV338" bgcolor=#E9E9E9
| 0 ||  || MBA-M || 17.5 || 1.8 km || multiple || 2003–2017 || 23 Sep 2017 || 47 || align=left | Disc.: SDSS || 
|- id="2003 SW338" bgcolor=#fefefe
| 0 ||  || MBA-I || 19.06 || data-sort-value="0.46" | 460 m || multiple || 2002–2021 || 27 Nov 2021 || 58 || align=left | Disc.: SDSSAlt.: 2014 VM21 || 
|- id="2003 SL339" bgcolor=#fefefe
| 0 ||  || MBA-I || 18.71 || data-sort-value="0.54" | 540 m || multiple || 2003–2021 || 08 May 2021 || 72 || align=left | Disc.: SDSS || 
|- id="2003 SN339" bgcolor=#d6d6d6
| 0 ||  || MBA-O || 15.96 || 3.6 km || multiple || 2001–2021 || 17 Apr 2021 || 280 || align=left | Disc.: SDSSAlt.: 2011 GZ87 || 
|- id="2003 SQ339" bgcolor=#fefefe
| 0 ||  || MBA-I || 18.7 || data-sort-value="0.54" | 540 m || multiple || 2003–2021 || 02 Dec 2021 || 71 || align=left | Disc.: SDSS || 
|- id="2003 SR339" bgcolor=#d6d6d6
| 0 ||  || MBA-O || 16.74 || 2.5 km || multiple || 2001–2021 || 10 Apr 2021 || 119 || align=left | Disc.: SDSS || 
|- id="2003 SU339" bgcolor=#E9E9E9
| 0 ||  || MBA-M || 17.5 || 1.3 km || multiple || 2003–2021 || 11 Jan 2021 || 102 || align=left | Disc.: SDSS || 
|- id="2003 SX339" bgcolor=#fefefe
| 0 ||  || HUN || 18.6 || data-sort-value="0.57" | 570 m || multiple || 2003–2021 || 22 Apr 2021 || 90 || align=left | Disc.: SDSS || 
|- id="2003 SY339" bgcolor=#E9E9E9
| 0 ||  || MBA-M || 17.07 || 1.1 km || multiple || 1993–2021 || 10 Apr 2021 || 218 || align=left | Disc.: SDSS || 
|- id="2003 SA340" bgcolor=#E9E9E9
| 0 ||  || MBA-M || 17.9 || data-sort-value="0.78" | 780 m || multiple || 2003–2020 || 16 Dec 2020 || 49 || align=left | Disc.: SDSS || 
|- id="2003 SE340" bgcolor=#d6d6d6
| 0 ||  || MBA-O || 17.5 || 1.8 km || multiple || 2003–2020 || 20 Oct 2020 || 65 || align=left | Disc.: SDSS || 
|- id="2003 SH340" bgcolor=#E9E9E9
| 0 ||  || MBA-M || 17.89 || 1.5 km || multiple || 2003–2021 || 25 Nov 2021 || 67 || align=left | Disc.: SDSS || 
|- id="2003 SJ340" bgcolor=#fefefe
| 0 ||  || MBA-I || 18.2 || data-sort-value="0.68" | 680 m || multiple || 2003–2021 || 17 Jan 2021 || 116 || align=left | Disc.: SDSS || 
|- id="2003 SK340" bgcolor=#E9E9E9
| 0 ||  || MBA-M || 17.8 || data-sort-value="0.82" | 820 m || multiple || 2003–2020 || 15 Dec 2020 || 60 || align=left | Disc.: SDSS || 
|- id="2003 SL340" bgcolor=#d6d6d6
| 0 ||  || MBA-O || 16.0 || 3.5 km || multiple || 2003–2020 || 15 Dec 2020 || 175 || align=left | Disc.: SpacewatchAlt.: 2009 SW333, 2010 AC85, 2015 WR6 || 
|- id="2003 SU340" bgcolor=#d6d6d6
| 0 ||  || MBA-O || 16.81 || 2.4 km || multiple || 2003–2022 || 08 Jan 2022 || 74 || align=left | Disc.: Spacewatch || 
|- id="2003 SW340" bgcolor=#fefefe
| 0 ||  || MBA-I || 19.23 || data-sort-value="0.42" | 420 m || multiple || 2003–2021 || 26 Oct 2021 || 58 || align=left | Disc.: SpacewatchAdded on 21 August 2021 || 
|- id="2003 SY340" bgcolor=#d6d6d6
| 0 ||  || MBA-O || 16.8 || 2.4 km || multiple || 2003–2021 || 06 Jan 2021 || 68 || align=left | Disc.: SpacewatchAlt.: 2011 CM36 || 
|- id="2003 SZ340" bgcolor=#d6d6d6
| 0 ||  || MBA-O || 17.3 || 1.9 km || multiple || 2003–2021 || 16 Jan 2021 || 63 || align=left | Disc.: SpacewatchAlt.: 2014 WU28 || 
|- id="2003 SA341" bgcolor=#d6d6d6
| 2 ||  || MBA-O || 17.9 || 1.5 km || multiple || 2003–2019 || 25 Sep 2019 || 27 || align=left | Disc.: SpacewatchAlt.: 2019 PM30 || 
|- id="2003 SH341" bgcolor=#fefefe
| 0 ||  || MBA-I || 18.24 || data-sort-value="0.67" | 670 m || multiple || 2003–2021 || 24 Sep 2021 || 134 || align=left | Disc.: SpacewatchAlt.: 2007 VH290 || 
|- id="2003 SR341" bgcolor=#E9E9E9
| 0 ||  || MBA-M || 17.4 || 1.4 km || multiple || 2003–2020 || 17 Oct 2020 || 125 || align=left | Disc.: Spacewatch || 
|- id="2003 SV341" bgcolor=#E9E9E9
| 2 ||  || MBA-M || 17.8 || data-sort-value="0.82" | 820 m || multiple || 2003–2021 || 07 Jan 2021 || 21 || align=left | Disc.: Spacewatch || 
|- id="2003 SW341" bgcolor=#d6d6d6
| 1 ||  || MBA-O || 17.1 || 2.1 km || multiple || 2003–2019 || 22 Oct 2019 || 45 || align=left | Disc.: Spacewatch || 
|- id="2003 SX341" bgcolor=#fefefe
| 2 ||  || MBA-I || 19.1 || data-sort-value="0.45" | 450 m || multiple || 2003–2016 || 06 Oct 2016 || 27 || align=left | Disc.: Spacewatch || 
|- id="2003 SC342" bgcolor=#d6d6d6
| 1 ||  || MBA-O || 16.9 || 2.3 km || multiple || 2003–2020 || 17 Nov 2020 || 44 || align=left | Disc.: Spacewatch || 
|- id="2003 SG342" bgcolor=#E9E9E9
| 0 ||  || MBA-M || 17.7 || 1.2 km || multiple || 2003–2020 || 06 Dec 2020 || 97 || align=left | Disc.: Spacewatch || 
|- id="2003 SA343" bgcolor=#d6d6d6
| 0 ||  || MBA-O || 16.2 || 3.2 km || multiple || 1992–2021 || 14 Jan 2021 || 290 || align=left | Disc.: SpacewatchAlt.: 2015 XH88 || 
|- id="2003 SB343" bgcolor=#d6d6d6
| 0 ||  || MBA-O || 17.37 || 1.9 km || multiple || 2003–2022 || 08 Jan 2022 || 85 || align=left | Disc.: SpacewatchAlt.: 2010 BE108, 2014 QC48, 2015 XV84 || 
|- id="2003 SF343" bgcolor=#E9E9E9
| 0 ||  || MBA-M || 17.1 || 1.1 km || multiple || 2003–2020 || 11 Nov 2020 || 114 || align=left | Disc.: SpacewatchAlt.: 2015 PN16 || 
|- id="2003 SG343" bgcolor=#d6d6d6
| 0 ||  || MBA-O || 16.7 || 2.5 km || multiple || 2003–2020 || 20 Oct 2020 || 143 || align=left | Disc.: SpacewatchAlt.: 2010 BP37 || 
|- id="2003 SJ343" bgcolor=#E9E9E9
| 0 ||  || MBA-M || 18.2 || data-sort-value="0.68" | 680 m || multiple || 1999–2021 || 07 Jan 2021 || 50 || align=left | Disc.: SpacewatchAlt.: 2017 DE17 || 
|- id="2003 SY343" bgcolor=#FA8072
| 2 ||  || MCA || 19.9 || data-sort-value="0.31" | 310 m || multiple || 2003–2017 || 22 Oct 2017 || 27 || align=left | Disc.: Spacewatch || 
|- id="2003 SG344" bgcolor=#fefefe
| 0 ||  || MBA-I || 18.18 || data-sort-value="0.69" | 690 m || multiple || 2003–2021 || 12 Nov 2021 || 72 || align=left | Disc.: SpacewatchAdded on 30 September 2021 || 
|- id="2003 SH344" bgcolor=#d6d6d6
| 0 ||  || MBA-O || 16.68 || 2.6 km || multiple || 2001–2021 || 08 Apr 2021 || 182 || align=left | Disc.: SpacewatchAlt.: 2010 CC133, 2014 WN322, 2016 CT115 || 
|- id="2003 SL344" bgcolor=#E9E9E9
| 0 ||  || MBA-M || 17.52 || 1.3 km || multiple || 1999–2022 || 27 Jan 2022 || 143 || align=left | Disc.: Spacewatch || 
|- id="2003 SO344" bgcolor=#fefefe
| 0 ||  || MBA-I || 18.5 || data-sort-value="0.59" | 590 m || multiple || 2003–2020 || 20 Jul 2020 || 52 || align=left | Disc.: Spacewatch || 
|- id="2003 SV344" bgcolor=#fefefe
| 0 ||  || MBA-I || 18.08 || data-sort-value="0.72" | 720 m || multiple || 2003–2021 || 28 Nov 2021 || 117 || align=left | Disc.: Spacewatch || 
|- id="2003 SJ345" bgcolor=#E9E9E9
| – ||  || MBA-M || 19.1 || data-sort-value="0.45" | 450 m || single || 11 days || 29 Sep 2003 || 9 || align=left | Disc.: Spacewatch || 
|- id="2003 SP345" bgcolor=#E9E9E9
| 1 ||  || MBA-M || 18.3 || data-sort-value="0.65" | 650 m || multiple || 2003–2020 || 12 Dec 2020 || 21 || align=left | Disc.: NEAT || 
|- id="2003 SQ345" bgcolor=#E9E9E9
| 0 ||  || MBA-M || 16.9 || 1.8 km || multiple || 2001–2020 || 07 Dec 2020 || 169 || align=left | Disc.: NEATAlt.: 2014 DT125, 2015 KZ10 || 
|- id="2003 SW345" bgcolor=#E9E9E9
| 3 ||  || MBA-M || 17.8 || 1.5 km || multiple || 2003–2017 || 13 Nov 2017 || 32 || align=left | Disc.: Spacewatch || 
|- id="2003 SB346" bgcolor=#d6d6d6
| – ||  || MBA-O || 18.4 || 1.2 km || single || 10 days || 28 Sep 2003 || 8 || align=left | Disc.: Spacewatch || 
|- id="2003 SC346" bgcolor=#d6d6d6
| 0 ||  || MBA-O || 17.3 || 1.9 km || multiple || 1998–2021 || 11 Jan 2021 || 66 || align=left | Disc.: Spacewatch || 
|- id="2003 SD346" bgcolor=#E9E9E9
| 1 ||  || MBA-M || 18.73 || 1.0 km || multiple || 2003–2021 || 06 Oct 2021 || 41 || align=left | Disc.: Spacewatch || 
|- id="2003 SH346" bgcolor=#d6d6d6
| D ||  || MBA-O || 17.3 || 1.9 km || single || 11 days || 29 Sep 2003 || 9 || align=left | Disc.: SpacewatchAlt.: 2003 SO434 || 
|- id="2003 SU346" bgcolor=#E9E9E9
| 1 ||  || MBA-M || 19.0 || data-sort-value="0.67" | 670 m || multiple || 2003–2020 || 10 Aug 2020 || 51 || align=left | Disc.: Spacewatch || 
|- id="2003 SV346" bgcolor=#fefefe
| 0 ||  || MBA-I || 18.5 || data-sort-value="0.59" | 590 m || multiple || 2002–2020 || 11 Dec 2020 || 62 || align=left | Disc.: Spacewatch || 
|- id="2003 SY346" bgcolor=#fefefe
| 0 ||  || MBA-I || 18.8 || data-sort-value="0.52" | 520 m || multiple || 2003–2018 || 10 Nov 2018 || 56 || align=left | Disc.: SpacewatchAlt.: 2007 VA164 || 
|- id="2003 SZ346" bgcolor=#d6d6d6
| – ||  || MBA-O || 18.9 || data-sort-value="0.92" | 920 m || single || 10 days || 28 Sep 2003 || 7 || align=left | Disc.: Spacewatch || 
|- id="2003 SA347" bgcolor=#d6d6d6
| 1 ||  || MBA-O || 17.4 || 1.8 km || multiple || 2003–2021 || 16 Jan 2021 || 25 || align=left | Disc.: Spacewatch || 
|- id="2003 SD347" bgcolor=#E9E9E9
| 0 ||  || MBA-M || 17.97 || 1.4 km || multiple || 2003–2021 || 28 Sep 2021 || 47 || align=left | Disc.: SpacewatchAdded on 21 August 2021Alt.: 2008 UA221 || 
|- id="2003 SG347" bgcolor=#fefefe
| – ||  || MBA-I || 18.8 || data-sort-value="0.52" | 520 m || single || 10 days || 28 Sep 2003 || 8 || align=left | Disc.: Spacewatch || 
|- id="2003 SK347" bgcolor=#E9E9E9
| 0 ||  || MBA-M || 19.0 || data-sort-value="0.67" | 670 m || multiple || 2003–2020 || 16 Sep 2020 || 76 || align=left | Disc.: SpacewatchAlt.: 2016 WE50 || 
|- id="2003 SO347" bgcolor=#E9E9E9
| 2 ||  || MBA-M || 19.6 || data-sort-value="0.51" | 510 m || multiple || 2003–2020 || 17 Oct 2020 || 34 || align=left | Disc.: SpacewatchAlt.: 2020 PV36 || 
|- id="2003 SS347" bgcolor=#d6d6d6
| 0 ||  || MBA-O || 16.7 || 2.5 km || multiple || 2003–2020 || 11 Oct 2020 || 65 || align=left | Disc.: Spacewatch || 
|- id="2003 SE348" bgcolor=#E9E9E9
| 1 ||  || MBA-M || 18.6 || data-sort-value="0.80" | 800 m || multiple || 2003–2021 || 05 Jan 2021 || 48 || align=left | Disc.: SpacewatchAdded on 11 May 2021Alt.: 2020 QG44 || 
|- id="2003 SG348" bgcolor=#fefefe
| – ||  || MBA-I || 20.0 || data-sort-value="0.30" | 300 m || single || 11 days || 29 Sep 2003 || 12 || align=left | Disc.: Spacewatch || 
|- id="2003 SH348" bgcolor=#d6d6d6
| 0 ||  || MBA-O || 17.2 || 2.0 km || multiple || 2003–2021 || 22 Jan 2021 || 30 || align=left | Disc.: SpacewatchAlt.: 2016 CZ115 || 
|- id="2003 SK348" bgcolor=#fefefe
| 0 ||  || MBA-I || 18.05 || data-sort-value="0.73" | 730 m || multiple || 2003–2021 || 30 Jun 2021 || 129 || align=left | Disc.: SpacewatchAlt.: 2011 WF94, 2013 EX121 || 
|- id="2003 SN348" bgcolor=#fefefe
| – ||  || MBA-I || 20.7 || data-sort-value="0.22" | 220 m || single || 10 days || 28 Sep 2003 || 7 || align=left | Disc.: Spacewatch || 
|- id="2003 SS348" bgcolor=#fefefe
| 0 ||  || MBA-I || 19.5 || data-sort-value="0.37" | 370 m || multiple || 2003–2019 || 26 Sep 2019 || 63 || align=left | Disc.: SpacewatchAlt.: 2016 WW15 || 
|- id="2003 SW348" bgcolor=#E9E9E9
| 1 ||  || MBA-M || 18.0 || 1.1 km || multiple || 2003–2020 || 11 Oct 2020 || 57 || align=left | Disc.: SpacewatchAlt.: 2016 TV79 || 
|- id="2003 SY348" bgcolor=#E9E9E9
| 1 ||  || MBA-M || 18.7 || data-sort-value="0.54" | 540 m || multiple || 1999–2019 || 28 Aug 2019 || 38 || align=left | Disc.: Spacewatch || 
|- id="2003 SC349" bgcolor=#E9E9E9
| 0 ||  || MBA-M || 17.66 || 1.6 km || multiple || 2003–2021 || 07 Sep 2021 || 79 || align=left | Disc.: SpacewatchAlt.: 2008 VC28 || 
|- id="2003 SG349" bgcolor=#E9E9E9
| 0 ||  || MBA-M || 17.8 || 1.2 km || multiple || 2003–2020 || 17 Oct 2020 || 72 || align=left | Disc.: SpacewatchAdded on 17 January 2021 || 
|- id="2003 SL349" bgcolor=#d6d6d6
| 1 ||  || MBA-O || 18.1 || 1.3 km || multiple || 2003–2019 || 22 Sep 2019 || 29 || align=left | Disc.: Spacewatch || 
|- id="2003 SQ349" bgcolor=#fefefe
| 2 ||  || MBA-I || 19.3 || data-sort-value="0.41" | 410 m || multiple || 2003–2017 || 26 Nov 2017 || 30 || align=left | Disc.: Spacewatch || 
|- id="2003 SS349" bgcolor=#fefefe
| 1 ||  || MBA-I || 19.1 || data-sort-value="0.45" | 450 m || multiple || 2003–2018 || 13 Dec 2018 || 42 || align=left | Disc.: SpacewatchAlt.: 2014 QX488 || 
|- id="2003 SW349" bgcolor=#d6d6d6
| 0 ||  || MBA-O || 16.84 || 2.4 km || multiple || 2003–2022 || 27 Jan 2022 || 112 || align=left | Disc.: Spacewatch || 
|- id="2003 SZ349" bgcolor=#d6d6d6
| 4 ||  || MBA-O || 18.0 || 1.4 km || multiple || 2003–2014 || 30 Aug 2014 || 19 || align=left | Disc.: SpacewatchAdded on 21 August 2021 || 
|- id="2003 SB350" bgcolor=#E9E9E9
| 0 ||  || MBA-M || 17.7 || data-sort-value="0.86" | 860 m || multiple || 2002–2020 || 14 Dec 2020 || 111 || align=left | Disc.: NEAT || 
|- id="2003 SP350" bgcolor=#E9E9E9
| 0 ||  || MBA-M || 19.40 || data-sort-value="0.55" | 550 m || multiple || 2003–2021 || 05 Jan 2021 || 51 || align=left | Disc.: SpacewatchAdded on 21 August 2021Alt.: 2020 SY80 || 
|- id="2003 SW350" bgcolor=#fefefe
| 0 ||  || MBA-I || 18.63 || data-sort-value="0.56" | 560 m || multiple || 2003–2021 || 09 Nov 2021 || 50 || align=left | Disc.: Spacewatch || 
|- id="2003 SZ350" bgcolor=#d6d6d6
| 2 ||  || MBA-O || 17.5 || 1.8 km || multiple || 2003–2018 || 08 Aug 2018 || 29 || align=left | Disc.: NEAT || 
|- id="2003 SA351" bgcolor=#fefefe
| 0 ||  || MBA-I || 18.8 || data-sort-value="0.52" | 520 m || multiple || 1993–2019 || 04 Jul 2019 || 69 || align=left | Disc.: NEATAlt.: 2016 QS5 || 
|- id="2003 SL352" bgcolor=#E9E9E9
| 3 ||  || MBA-M || 18.7 || data-sort-value="0.76" | 760 m || multiple || 2003–2020 || 14 Nov 2020 || 55 || align=left | Disc.: SpacewatchAdded on 17 January 2021 || 
|- id="2003 SQ352" bgcolor=#d6d6d6
| 0 ||  || MBA-O || 16.7 || 2.5 km || multiple || 2003–2021 || 17 Jan 2021 || 83 || align=left | Disc.: CINEOS || 
|- id="2003 SY352" bgcolor=#fefefe
| 0 ||  || MBA-I || 17.4 || data-sort-value="0.98" | 980 m || multiple || 2003–2021 || 17 Apr 2021 || 64 || align=left | Disc.: SpacewatchAdded on 11 May 2021Alt.: 2021 EF35 || 
|- id="2003 SZ353" bgcolor=#E9E9E9
| 1 ||  || MBA-M || 18.3 || data-sort-value="0.65" | 650 m || multiple || 2003–2019 || 28 Aug 2019 || 50 || align=left | Disc.: NEATAlt.: 2007 TD387 || 
|- id="2003 SB354" bgcolor=#d6d6d6
| 0 ||  || MBA-O || 16.5 || 2.8 km || multiple || 2003–2020 || 06 Dec 2020 || 102 || align=left | Disc.: LONEOSAlt.: 2014 SP234 || 
|- id="2003 SJ354" bgcolor=#E9E9E9
| 0 ||  || MBA-M || 17.27 || 2.0 km || multiple || 2003–2021 || 24 Nov 2021 || 105 || align=left | Disc.: NEAT || 
|- id="2003 SK354" bgcolor=#E9E9E9
| 0 ||  || MBA-M || 17.55 || data-sort-value="0.92" | 920 m || multiple || 2003–2021 || 12 Feb 2021 || 30 || align=left | Disc.: NEAT || 
|- id="2003 SN354" bgcolor=#fefefe
| 0 ||  || MBA-I || 18.33 || data-sort-value="0.64" | 640 m || multiple || 2003–2021 || 15 Apr 2021 || 71 || align=left | Disc.: LONEOSAlt.: 2010 JN45 || 
|- id="2003 SS354" bgcolor=#fefefe
| 3 ||  || MBA-I || 19.1 || data-sort-value="0.45" | 450 m || multiple || 2003–2020 || 21 Sep 2020 || 25 || align=left | Disc.: LONEOSAlt.: 2010 WP33 || 
|- id="2003 ST354" bgcolor=#E9E9E9
| 0 ||  || MBA-M || 17.0 || 1.7 km || multiple || 2003–2020 || 16 Nov 2020 || 128 || align=left | Disc.: LONEOS || 
|- id="2003 SV354" bgcolor=#E9E9E9
| 0 ||  || MBA-M || 17.4 || 1.4 km || multiple || 2003–2021 || 06 Jan 2021 || 248 || align=left | Disc.: NEAT || 
|- id="2003 SZ354" bgcolor=#E9E9E9
| 0 ||  || MBA-M || 17.6 || data-sort-value="0.90" | 900 m || multiple || 2003–2021 || 16 Jan 2021 || 76 || align=left | Disc.: NEATAlt.: 2009 AJ5, 2014 EN121 || 
|- id="2003 SF355" bgcolor=#fefefe
| 0 ||  || MBA-I || 18.32 || data-sort-value="0.64" | 640 m || multiple || 2003–2021 || 24 Nov 2021 || 101 || align=left | Disc.: NEAT || 
|- id="2003 SU355" bgcolor=#E9E9E9
| 0 ||  || MBA-M || 17.3 || 1.5 km || multiple || 2003–2021 || 15 Jan 2021 || 131 || align=left | Disc.: LINEARAdded on 22 July 2020Alt.: 2013 BH7 || 
|- id="2003 SR356" bgcolor=#fefefe
| 1 ||  || MBA-I || 19.0 || data-sort-value="0.47" | 470 m || multiple || 2003–2020 || 05 Nov 2020 || 27 || align=left | Disc.: LPL/Spacewatch II || 
|- id="2003 SW356" bgcolor=#fefefe
| 0 ||  || MBA-I || 18.70 || data-sort-value="0.54" | 540 m || multiple || 2003–2022 || 21 Jan 2022 || 100 || align=left | Disc.: LPL/Spacewatch IIAlt.: 2007 YL49 || 
|- id="2003 SD357" bgcolor=#fefefe
| 2 ||  || MBA-I || 19.6 || data-sort-value="0.36" | 360 m || multiple || 2003–2019 || 25 Sep 2019 || 19 || align=left | Disc.: LPL/Spacewatch IIAdded on 21 August 2021 || 
|- id="2003 SJ357" bgcolor=#E9E9E9
| 0 ||  || MBA-M || 17.77 || 1.6 km || multiple || 2003–2021 || 13 Jul 2021 || 52 || align=left | Disc.: SpacewatchAlt.: 2008 UW177 || 
|- id="2003 SL357" bgcolor=#d6d6d6
| 0 ||  || MBA-O || 17.14 || 2.1 km || multiple || 2003–2021 || 13 May 2021 || 79 || align=left | Disc.: Spacewatch || 
|- id="2003 SO357" bgcolor=#d6d6d6
| 0 ||  || MBA-O || 16.9 || 2.3 km || multiple || 2003–2021 || 18 Jan 2021 || 77 || align=left | Disc.: LPL/Spacewatch II || 
|- id="2003 SP357" bgcolor=#E9E9E9
| 0 ||  || MBA-M || 17.7 || data-sort-value="0.86" | 860 m || multiple || 2003–2020 || 19 Nov 2020 || 58 || align=left | Disc.: LPL/Spacewatch IIAdded on 11 May 2021Alt.: 2014 EU219 || 
|- id="2003 SS357" bgcolor=#E9E9E9
| 0 ||  || MBA-M || 18.0 || 1.4 km || multiple || 2003–2021 || 10 Sep 2021 || 34 || align=left | Disc.: LPL/Spacewatch IIAdded on 29 January 2022 || 
|- id="2003 SU357" bgcolor=#fefefe
| 0 ||  || MBA-I || 18.8 || data-sort-value="0.52" | 520 m || multiple || 2003–2020 || 15 Oct 2020 || 50 || align=left | Disc.: LPL/Spacewatch IIAdded on 17 January 2021 || 
|- id="2003 SA358" bgcolor=#E9E9E9
| 0 ||  || MBA-M || 17.7 || data-sort-value="0.86" | 860 m || multiple || 2003–2020 || 16 Dec 2020 || 80 || align=left | Disc.: LPL/Spacewatch IIAlt.: 2009 AB37 || 
|- id="2003 SD358" bgcolor=#d6d6d6
| 0 ||  || MBA-O || 15.9 || 3.7 km || multiple || 2003–2020 || 15 Dec 2020 || 134 || align=left | Disc.: LPL/Spacewatch II || 
|- id="2003 SJ358" bgcolor=#E9E9E9
| 1 ||  || MBA-M || 17.8 || data-sort-value="0.82" | 820 m || multiple || 2003–2021 || 08 Jan 2021 || 43 || align=left | Disc.: Spacewatch || 
|- id="2003 SO358" bgcolor=#E9E9E9
| 1 ||  || MBA-M || 18.2 || data-sort-value="0.96" | 960 m || multiple || 2003–2020 || 23 Nov 2020 || 51 || align=left | Disc.: SpacewatchAdded on 17 January 2021Alt.: 2007 RF263 || 
|- id="2003 SP358" bgcolor=#FA8072
| 2 ||  || MCA || 17.9 || data-sort-value="0.78" | 780 m || multiple || 2003–2019 || 04 Apr 2019 || 35 || align=left | Disc.: Spacewatch || 
|- id="2003 SQ358" bgcolor=#E9E9E9
| 3 ||  || MBA-M || 17.9 || data-sort-value="0.78" | 780 m || multiple || 2003–2020 || 23 Oct 2020 || 20 || align=left | Disc.: SpacewatchAdded on 30 September 2021 || 
|- id="2003 SR358" bgcolor=#d6d6d6
| 0 ||  || MBA-O || 16.86 || 2.8 km || multiple || 2003–2022 || 25 Jan 2022 || 94 || align=left | Disc.: SpacewatchAlt.: 2010 BC47 || 
|- id="2003 SU358" bgcolor=#d6d6d6
| 0 ||  || MBA-O || 17.12 || 2.1 km || multiple || 2003–2021 || 03 May 2021 || 97 || align=left | Disc.: Spacewatch || 
|- id="2003 SH359" bgcolor=#fefefe
| 0 ||  || MBA-I || 18.6 || data-sort-value="0.57" | 570 m || multiple || 2003–2021 || 18 Jan 2021 || 65 || align=left | Disc.: Spacewatch || 
|- id="2003 SO359" bgcolor=#d6d6d6
| 0 ||  || MBA-O || 17.0 || 2.2 km || multiple || 2003–2018 || 10 Oct 2018 || 76 || align=left | Disc.: SpacewatchAlt.: 2007 GQ42, 2012 JN21 || 
|- id="2003 SP359" bgcolor=#E9E9E9
| 0 ||  || MBA-M || 17.68 || 1.6 km || multiple || 2003–2021 || 09 Sep 2021 || 48 || align=left | Disc.: Spacewatch || 
|- id="2003 SR359" bgcolor=#d6d6d6
| 0 ||  || MBA-O || 15.7 || 4.0 km || multiple || 1993–2021 || 17 Jan 2021 || 277 || align=left | Disc.: SpacewatchAlt.: 2010 DL85, 2012 JB22 || 
|- id="2003 ST359" bgcolor=#d6d6d6
| 0 ||  || MBA-O || 17.3 || 1.9 km || multiple || 2003–2019 || 03 Oct 2019 || 127 || align=left | Disc.: SpacewatchAlt.: 2010 AX17 || 
|- id="2003 SW359" bgcolor=#E9E9E9
| 0 ||  || MBA-M || 16.8 || 1.3 km || multiple || 2003–2021 || 05 Jan 2021 || 85 || align=left | Disc.: Spacewatch || 
|- id="2003 SZ359" bgcolor=#d6d6d6
| 0 ||  || MBA-O || 16.82 || 2.4 km || multiple || 2003–2022 || 25 Jan 2022 || 87 || align=left | Disc.: SpacewatchAlt.: 2010 BT108, 2015 YU19 || 
|- id="2003 SD360" bgcolor=#E9E9E9
| 2 ||  || MBA-M || 18.5 || data-sort-value="0.59" | 590 m || multiple || 1995–2021 || 07 Feb 2021 || 71 || align=left | Disc.: SpacewatchAlt.: 1995 SK71 || 
|- id="2003 SF360" bgcolor=#E9E9E9
| 3 ||  || MBA-M || 18.6 || data-sort-value="0.80" | 800 m || multiple || 2003–2020 || 08 Dec 2020 || 26 || align=left | Disc.: Spacewatch || 
|- id="2003 SG360" bgcolor=#E9E9E9
| 1 ||  || MBA-M || 17.9 || 1.1 km || multiple || 2003–2020 || 17 Nov 2020 || 40 || align=left | Disc.: SpacewatchAdded on 17 January 2021 || 
|- id="2003 SM360" bgcolor=#fefefe
| 1 ||  || MBA-I || 19.36 || data-sort-value="0.40" | 400 m || multiple || 2003–2021 || 02 Dec 2021 || 29 || align=left | Disc.: SpacewatchAlt.: 2017 PC36 || 
|- id="2003 SP360" bgcolor=#d6d6d6
| 0 ||  || MBA-O || 17.6 || 1.7 km || multiple || 2003–2020 || 17 Dec 2020 || 33 || align=left | Disc.: Spacewatch || 
|- id="2003 SX360" bgcolor=#fefefe
| 0 ||  || MBA-I || 19.0 || data-sort-value="0.47" | 470 m || multiple || 2000–2019 || 01 Jul 2019 || 48 || align=left | Disc.: Spacewatch || 
|- id="2003 SB361" bgcolor=#fefefe
| 0 ||  || MBA-I || 18.3 || data-sort-value="0.65" | 650 m || multiple || 2003–2021 || 18 Jan 2021 || 59 || align=left | Disc.: Spacewatch || 
|- id="2003 SD361" bgcolor=#d6d6d6
| 0 ||  || MBA-O || 17.4 || 1.8 km || multiple || 2003–2020 || 10 Dec 2020 || 37 || align=left | Disc.: Spacewatch || 
|- id="2003 SE361" bgcolor=#fefefe
| 0 ||  || MBA-I || 18.29 || data-sort-value="0.65" | 650 m || multiple || 2003–2021 || 07 Aug 2021 || 55 || align=left | Disc.: Spacewatch || 
|- id="2003 SR361" bgcolor=#FA8072
| 1 ||  || MCA || 19.0 || data-sort-value="0.47" | 470 m || multiple || 2003–2016 || 25 Oct 2016 || 43 || align=left | Disc.: SpacewatchAlt.: 2016 PR69 || 
|- id="2003 SV361" bgcolor=#fefefe
| 0 ||  || MBA-I || 18.89 || data-sort-value="0.50" | 500 m || multiple || 1992–2021 || 02 Oct 2021 || 70 || align=left | Disc.: LPL/Spacewatch IIAlt.: 2014 UU187 || 
|- id="2003 SY361" bgcolor=#E9E9E9
| 0 ||  || MBA-M || 17.3 || 1.0 km || multiple || 2003–2020 || 20 Dec 2020 || 82 || align=left | Disc.: Spacewatch || 
|- id="2003 SH362" bgcolor=#E9E9E9
| 1 ||  || MBA-M || 18.0 || 1.1 km || multiple || 2003–2020 || 17 Dec 2020 || 76 || align=left | Disc.: LPL/Spacewatch IIAdded on 17 January 2021 || 
|- id="2003 SK362" bgcolor=#fefefe
| 0 ||  || MBA-I || 19.09 || data-sort-value="0.45" | 450 m || multiple || 2003–2021 || 07 Oct 2021 || 63 || align=left | Disc.: LPL/Spacewatch IIAlt.: 2014 WH21 || 
|- id="2003 SL362" bgcolor=#E9E9E9
| 2 ||  || MBA-M || 18.1 || data-sort-value="0.71" | 710 m || multiple || 2003–2019 || 20 Aug 2019 || 56 || align=left | Disc.: LPL/Spacewatch IIAlt.: 2007 RG149 || 
|- id="2003 SQ362" bgcolor=#E9E9E9
| 0 ||  || MBA-M || 17.8 || data-sort-value="0.82" | 820 m || multiple || 2003–2021 || 18 Jan 2021 || 65 || align=left | Disc.: SpacewatchAlt.: 2015 RZ14 || 
|- id="2003 SR362" bgcolor=#E9E9E9
| 0 ||  || MBA-M || 17.9 || 1.1 km || multiple || 2003–2020 || 10 Dec 2020 || 93 || align=left | Disc.: Spacewatch || 
|- id="2003 ST362" bgcolor=#fefefe
| 0 ||  || MBA-I || 18.94 || data-sort-value="0.48" | 480 m || multiple || 2003–2021 || 30 Nov 2021 || 55 || align=left | Disc.: Spacewatch || 
|- id="2003 SV362" bgcolor=#fefefe
| 1 ||  || MBA-I || 18.8 || data-sort-value="0.52" | 520 m || multiple || 1996–2020 || 15 Aug 2020 || 77 || align=left | Disc.: SpacewatchAlt.: 2010 OR52, 2010 OA136 || 
|- id="2003 SY362" bgcolor=#E9E9E9
| 0 ||  || MBA-M || 17.4 || 1.4 km || multiple || 2003–2020 || 05 Nov 2020 || 103 || align=left | Disc.: Spacewatch || 
|- id="2003 SC363" bgcolor=#E9E9E9
| 1 ||  || MBA-M || 17.9 || 1.1 km || multiple || 2003–2020 || 21 Jul 2020 || 43 || align=left | Disc.: Spacewatch || 
|- id="2003 SJ363" bgcolor=#fefefe
| 2 ||  || MBA-I || 18.8 || data-sort-value="0.52" | 520 m || multiple || 1993–2019 || 28 May 2019 || 55 || align=left | Disc.: SpacewatchAlt.: 2003 UU231 || 
|- id="2003 SL363" bgcolor=#d6d6d6
| 0 ||  || MBA-O || 16.8 || 2.4 km || multiple || 1992–2020 || 16 Dec 2020 || 87 || align=left | Disc.: SpacewatchAlt.: 2014 UK188 || 
|- id="2003 SO363" bgcolor=#fefefe
| 1 ||  || HUN || 18.7 || data-sort-value="0.54" | 540 m || multiple || 2003–2020 || 16 May 2020 || 80 || align=left | Disc.: SpacewatchAlt.: 2015 FK356 || 
|- id="2003 SU363" bgcolor=#E9E9E9
| 0 ||  || MBA-M || 17.1 || 2.1 km || multiple || 2003–2020 || 21 Apr 2020 || 54 || align=left | Disc.: SDSSAlt.: 2015 CM46 || 
|- id="2003 SV363" bgcolor=#fefefe
| 0 ||  || MBA-I || 18.8 || data-sort-value="0.52" | 520 m || multiple || 2003–2020 || 09 Dec 2020 || 40 || align=left | Disc.: SDSSAlt.: 2013 SU76 || 
|- id="2003 SZ363" bgcolor=#fefefe
| 3 ||  || MBA-I || 19.3 || data-sort-value="0.41" | 410 m || multiple || 2003–2021 || 29 Nov 2021 || 19 || align=left | Disc.: SDSSAdded on 29 January 2022 || 
|- id="2003 SA364" bgcolor=#E9E9E9
| 0 ||  || MBA-M || 17.80 || 1.5 km || multiple || 2003–2021 || 09 Nov 2021 || 75 || align=left | Disc.: SDSSAlt.: 2008 WC48 || 
|- id="2003 SB364" bgcolor=#d6d6d6
| 0 ||  || MBA-O || 16.89 || 2.3 km || multiple || 2003–2021 || 13 May 2021 || 79 || align=left | Disc.: SDSS || 
|- id="2003 SG364" bgcolor=#d6d6d6
| 0 ||  || MBA-O || 16.7 || 2.5 km || multiple || 2003–2019 || 25 Aug 2019 || 76 || align=left | Disc.: SDSSAlt.: 2015 TR120 || 
|- id="2003 SH364" bgcolor=#d6d6d6
| 0 ||  || MBA-O || 17.2 || 2.0 km || multiple || 2003–2019 || 20 Dec 2019 || 60 || align=left | Disc.: SDSS || 
|- id="2003 SL364" bgcolor=#d6d6d6
| 0 ||  || MBA-O || 17.04 || 2.2 km || multiple || 2003–2021 || 03 May 2021 || 84 || align=left | Disc.: SDSSAlt.: 2011 FN139 || 
|- id="2003 SC365" bgcolor=#E9E9E9
| 0 ||  || MBA-M || 17.17 || 2.0 km || multiple || 2001–2021 || 08 Sep 2021 || 74 || align=left | Disc.: SDSS || 
|- id="2003 SH365" bgcolor=#d6d6d6
| – ||  || MBA-O || 17.4 || 1.8 km || single || 12 days || 29 Sep 2003 || 9 || align=left | Disc.: SDSS || 
|- id="2003 SJ365" bgcolor=#E9E9E9
| 0 ||  || MBA-M || 17.68 || 1.2 km || multiple || 2003–2021 || 08 Dec 2021 || 85 || align=left | Disc.: SDSS || 
|- id="2003 SL365" bgcolor=#fefefe
| 0 ||  || MBA-I || 18.75 || data-sort-value="0.53" | 530 m || multiple || 2003–2021 || 13 Sep 2021 || 39 || align=left | Disc.: SDSS || 
|- id="2003 SM365" bgcolor=#E9E9E9
| – ||  || MBA-M || 18.5 || data-sort-value="0.84" | 840 m || single || 3 days || 29 Sep 2003 || 6 || align=left | Disc.: SDSS || 
|- id="2003 SA366" bgcolor=#fefefe
| 0 ||  || MBA-I || 17.95 || data-sort-value="0.76" | 760 m || multiple || 2000–2021 || 13 May 2021 || 157 || align=left | Disc.: SDSSAlt.: 2015 LV37 || 
|- id="2003 SC366" bgcolor=#E9E9E9
| 1 ||  || MBA-M || 18.20 || 1.3 km || multiple || 2003–2021 || 08 Sep 2021 || 25 || align=left | Disc.: SDSS || 
|- id="2003 SD366" bgcolor=#E9E9E9
| 1 ||  || MBA-M || 17.6 || data-sort-value="0.90" | 900 m || multiple || 2003–2021 || 09 Jan 2021 || 91 || align=left | Disc.: SDSS || 
|- id="2003 SH366" bgcolor=#E9E9E9
| 2 ||  || MBA-M || 18.0 || data-sort-value="0.75" | 750 m || multiple || 2003–2020 || 04 Nov 2020 || 28 || align=left | Disc.: SDSSAlt.: 2014 EZ83 || 
|- id="2003 SK366" bgcolor=#E9E9E9
| 0 ||  || MBA-M || 17.7 || 1.6 km || multiple || 2003–2020 || 22 Apr 2020 || 41 || align=left | Disc.: SDSS || 
|- id="2003 SN366" bgcolor=#fefefe
| 2 ||  || MBA-I || 19.4 || data-sort-value="0.39" | 390 m || multiple || 2003–2020 || 11 Oct 2020 || 33 || align=left | Disc.: SDSSAdded on 17 January 2021Alt.: 2010 VS76 || 
|- id="2003 SO366" bgcolor=#fefefe
| 0 ||  || MBA-I || 18.6 || data-sort-value="0.57" | 570 m || multiple || 2003–2021 || 11 May 2021 || 38 || align=left | Disc.: SDSSAlt.: 2014 QE270 || 
|- id="2003 SU366" bgcolor=#E9E9E9
| 0 ||  || MBA-M || 18.3 || data-sort-value="0.92" | 920 m || multiple || 2003–2020 || 17 Sep 2020 || 51 || align=left | Disc.: SDSS || 
|- id="2003 SV366" bgcolor=#E9E9E9
| 0 ||  || MBA-M || 17.1 || 1.1 km || multiple || 2003–2021 || 05 Jan 2021 || 107 || align=left | Disc.: SDSS || 
|- id="2003 SB367" bgcolor=#d6d6d6
| 0 ||  || MBA-O || 16.7 || 2.5 km || multiple || 2003–2020 || 10 Dec 2020 || 79 || align=left | Disc.: SDSS || 
|- id="2003 SF367" bgcolor=#E9E9E9
| 0 ||  || MBA-M || 17.7 || 1.6 km || multiple || 2003–2020 || 22 Apr 2020 || 69 || align=left | Disc.: SDSS || 
|- id="2003 SG367" bgcolor=#E9E9E9
| 0 ||  || MBA-M || 17.8 || 1.2 km || multiple || 2003–2020 || 07 Sep 2020 || 51 || align=left | Disc.: SDSSAdded on 19 October 2020 || 
|- id="2003 SH367" bgcolor=#fefefe
| 3 ||  || MBA-I || 19.9 || data-sort-value="0.31" | 310 m || multiple || 2003–2015 || 11 Jun 2015 || 14 || align=left | Disc.: SDSS || 
|- id="2003 SJ367" bgcolor=#E9E9E9
| 0 ||  || MBA-M || 18.53 || data-sort-value="0.58" | 580 m || multiple || 2003–2020 || 20 Oct 2020 || 34 || align=left | Disc.: SDSSAlt.: 2015 HP165 || 
|- id="2003 SK367" bgcolor=#E9E9E9
| 0 ||  || MBA-M || 18.3 || data-sort-value="0.65" | 650 m || multiple || 2003–2020 || 11 Nov 2020 || 44 || align=left | Disc.: SDSSAlt.: 2007 RB229, 2011 OA50 || 
|- id="2003 SR367" bgcolor=#E9E9E9
| 1 ||  || MBA-M || 18.1 || data-sort-value="0.71" | 710 m || multiple || 2003–2019 || 03 Jul 2019 || 49 || align=left | Disc.: SDSSAlt.: 2015 PP236 || 
|- id="2003 SV367" bgcolor=#E9E9E9
| 1 ||  || MBA-M || 18.49 || data-sort-value="0.84" | 840 m || multiple || 2003–2021 || 07 Nov 2021 || 29 || align=left | Disc.: SDSSAdded on 21 August 2021Alt.: 2012 TD279 || 
|- id="2003 SW367" bgcolor=#E9E9E9
| 0 ||  || MBA-M || 18.4 || data-sort-value="0.62" | 620 m || multiple || 2003–2021 || 09 Jan 2021 || 37 || align=left | Disc.: SDSSAdded on 9 March 2021 || 
|- id="2003 SC368" bgcolor=#fefefe
| 2 ||  || MBA-I || 19.3 || data-sort-value="0.41" | 410 m || multiple || 2003–2019 || 25 Sep 2019 || 29 || align=left | Disc.: SDSS || 
|- id="2003 SD368" bgcolor=#fefefe
| 0 ||  || MBA-I || 18.4 || data-sort-value="0.62" | 620 m || multiple || 2003–2020 || 14 Nov 2020 || 91 || align=left | Disc.: SDSSAlt.: 2015 DZ261 || 
|- id="2003 SK368" bgcolor=#d6d6d6
| 0 ||  || MBA-O || 17.2 || 2.0 km || multiple || 2003–2020 || 08 Dec 2020 || 38 || align=left | Disc.: SDSS || 
|- id="2003 SL368" bgcolor=#E9E9E9
| 3 ||  || MBA-M || 18.73 || data-sort-value="0.75" | 750 m || multiple || 2003–2021 || 11 Nov 2021 || 24 || align=left | Disc.: SDSS || 
|- id="2003 ST368" bgcolor=#d6d6d6
| 0 ||  || MBA-O || 17.49 || 1.8 km || multiple || 2003–2021 || 11 Jun 2021 || 94 || align=left | Disc.: SDSSAlt.: 2013 TZ44, 2015 DZ8 || 
|- id="2003 SY368" bgcolor=#E9E9E9
| 0 ||  || MBA-M || 17.49 || 1.3 km || multiple || 2001–2021 || 06 Nov 2021 || 126 || align=left | Disc.: SDSSAlt.: 2010 LK141 || 
|- id="2003 SO369" bgcolor=#d6d6d6
| 1 ||  || MBA-O || 17.8 || 1.5 km || multiple || 2003–2019 || 19 Nov 2019 || 35 || align=left | Disc.: SDSSAlt.: 2013 NW9 || 
|- id="2003 SP369" bgcolor=#E9E9E9
| 0 ||  || MBA-M || 17.98 || 1.4 km || multiple || 2003–2021 || 04 Oct 2021 || 45 || align=left | Disc.: SDSS || 
|- id="2003 SV369" bgcolor=#d6d6d6
| 0 ||  || MBA-O || 17.7 || 1.6 km || multiple || 2003–2019 || 20 Dec 2019 || 36 || align=left | Disc.: SDSS || 
|- id="2003 SA370" bgcolor=#E9E9E9
| 0 ||  || MBA-M || 18.03 || 1.4 km || multiple || 2003–2021 || 04 Oct 2021 || 47 || align=left | Disc.: SDSSAdded on 22 July 2020 || 
|- id="2003 SB370" bgcolor=#d6d6d6
| 0 ||  || MBA-O || 17.6 || 1.7 km || multiple || 2003–2021 || 17 Jan 2021 || 41 || align=left | Disc.: SDSSAlt.: 2014 SL330 || 
|- id="2003 SF370" bgcolor=#E9E9E9
| 0 ||  || MBA-M || 17.4 || data-sort-value="0.98" | 980 m || multiple || 2003–2021 || 16 Jan 2021 || 114 || align=left | Disc.: SDSS || 
|- id="2003 SG370" bgcolor=#fefefe
| 1 ||  || MBA-I || 19.0 || data-sort-value="0.47" | 470 m || multiple || 2003–2018 || 13 Aug 2018 || 39 || align=left | Disc.: SDSSAlt.: 2007 VU91 || 
|- id="2003 SH370" bgcolor=#E9E9E9
| 0 ||  || MBA-M || 17.73 || 1.2 km || multiple || 2003–2021 || 01 Dec 2021 || 70 || align=left | Disc.: SDSSAlt.: 2014 DB53 || 
|- id="2003 SJ370" bgcolor=#d6d6d6
| 0 ||  || MBA-O || 17.0 || 2.2 km || multiple || 2003–2021 || 22 Jan 2021 || 92 || align=left | Disc.: SDSSAlt.: 2016 CM98 || 
|- id="2003 SK370" bgcolor=#d6d6d6
| 0 ||  || MBA-O || 17.16 || 2.1 km || multiple || 2003–2021 || 26 Nov 2021 || 48 || align=left | Disc.: SDSSAdded on 24 December 2021 || 
|- id="2003 SL370" bgcolor=#fefefe
| E ||  || MBA-I || 19.7 || data-sort-value="0.34" | 340 m || single || 2 days || 28 Sep 2003 || 7 || align=left | Disc.: SDSS || 
|- id="2003 SM370" bgcolor=#E9E9E9
| 0 ||  || MBA-M || 17.60 || 1.3 km || multiple || 2003–2021 || 28 Nov 2021 || 111 || align=left | Disc.: SDSS || 
|- id="2003 SN370" bgcolor=#d6d6d6
| – ||  || MBA-O || 18.2 || 1.3 km || single || 3 days || 29 Sep 2003 || 7 || align=left | Disc.: SDSS || 
|- id="2003 ST370" bgcolor=#E9E9E9
| 2 ||  || MBA-M || 18.58 || 1.1 km || multiple || 2003–2021 || 13 Sep 2021 || 30 || align=left | Disc.: SDSSAdded on 30 September 2021 || 
|- id="2003 SU370" bgcolor=#fefefe
| 2 ||  || MBA-I || 19.6 || data-sort-value="0.36" | 360 m || multiple || 2003–2020 || 14 Oct 2020 || 26 || align=left | Disc.: SDSSAdded on 17 June 2021Alt.: 2020 RP21 || 
|- id="2003 SY370" bgcolor=#d6d6d6
| E ||  || MBA-O || 18.4 || 1.2 km || single || 3 days || 28 Sep 2003 || 8 || align=left | Disc.: SDSS || 
|- id="2003 SC371" bgcolor=#E9E9E9
| 0 ||  || MBA-M || 17.25 || 1.5 km || multiple || 2003–2021 || 14 Nov 2021 || 185 || align=left | Disc.: SDSSAlt.: 2010 EX30, 2010 JM131 || 
|- id="2003 SF371" bgcolor=#d6d6d6
| 0 ||  || MBA-O || 17.3 || 1.9 km || multiple || 2003–2018 || 14 Sep 2018 || 52 || align=left | Disc.: SDSS || 
|- id="2003 SH371" bgcolor=#fefefe
| 0 ||  || MBA-I || 18.89 || data-sort-value="0.50" | 500 m || multiple || 2003–2021 || 30 Jun 2021 || 49 || align=left | Disc.: SDSS || 
|- id="2003 SL371" bgcolor=#E9E9E9
| 0 ||  || MBA-M || 17.97 || 1.4 km || multiple || 2003–2021 || 07 Nov 2021 || 66 || align=left | Disc.: SDSS || 
|- id="2003 SM371" bgcolor=#E9E9E9
| – ||  || MBA-M || 19.9 || data-sort-value="0.44" | 440 m || single || 3 days || 29 Sep 2003 || 6 || align=left | Disc.: SDSS || 
|- id="2003 SN371" bgcolor=#E9E9E9
| 1 ||  || MBA-M || 17.5 || data-sort-value="0.94" | 940 m || multiple || 2003–2019 || 20 Sep 2019 || 134 || align=left | Disc.: SDSSAlt.: 2011 SC50, 2011 SY261 || 
|- id="2003 ST371" bgcolor=#E9E9E9
| 0 ||  || MBA-M || 18.7 || data-sort-value="0.76" | 760 m || multiple || 2003–2020 || 15 Oct 2020 || 86 || align=left | Disc.: SDSS || 
|- id="2003 SV371" bgcolor=#fefefe
| 3 ||  || MBA-I || 19.2 || data-sort-value="0.43" | 430 m || multiple || 2003–2014 || 25 Oct 2014 || 27 || align=left | Disc.: SDSSAlt.: 2014 SB402 || 
|- id="2003 SZ371" bgcolor=#fefefe
| 0 ||  || MBA-I || 19.25 || data-sort-value="0.42" | 420 m || multiple || 2003–2021 || 26 Oct 2021 || 46 || align=left | Disc.: SDSS || 
|- id="2003 SA372" bgcolor=#E9E9E9
| 0 ||  || MBA-M || 17.3 || 1.9 km || multiple || 2003–2020 || 19 Apr 2020 || 43 || align=left | Disc.: SDSSAdded on 13 September 2020 || 
|- id="2003 SC372" bgcolor=#d6d6d6
| 0 ||  || MBA-O || 17.1 || 2.1 km || multiple || 2003–2020 || 23 Dec 2020 || 93 || align=left | Disc.: SDSSAlt.: 2014 WW42 || 
|- id="2003 SF372" bgcolor=#E9E9E9
| E ||  || MBA-M || 18.4 || 1.2 km || single || 2 days || 28 Sep 2003 || 7 || align=left | Disc.: SDSS || 
|- id="2003 SH372" bgcolor=#d6d6d6
| 1 ||  || MBA-O || 17.7 || 1.6 km || multiple || 2003–2020 || 19 Apr 2020 || 41 || align=left | Disc.: SDSSAdded on 22 July 2020 || 
|- id="2003 SK372" bgcolor=#fefefe
| 0 ||  || MBA-I || 18.07 || data-sort-value="0.72" | 720 m || multiple || 2002–2021 || 31 Mar 2021 || 131 || align=left | Disc.: SDSSAlt.: 2005 EL134, 2015 KK127 || 
|- id="2003 SL372" bgcolor=#d6d6d6
| 0 ||  || MBA-O || 16.6 || 2.7 km || multiple || 2001–2021 || 11 Jan 2021 || 96 || align=left | Disc.: SDSS || 
|- id="2003 SM372" bgcolor=#d6d6d6
| 0 ||  || MBA-O || 17.0 || 2.2 km || multiple || 2003–2020 || 16 Nov 2020 || 63 || align=left | Disc.: SDSSAlt.: 2015 XM85 || 
|- id="2003 SN372" bgcolor=#fefefe
| 2 ||  || MBA-I || 19.6 || data-sort-value="0.36" | 360 m || multiple || 2003–2017 || 16 Oct 2017 || 26 || align=left | Disc.: SDSSAdded on 17 June 2021 || 
|- id="2003 SO372" bgcolor=#E9E9E9
| 3 ||  || MBA-M || 18.20 || data-sort-value="0.96" | 960 m || multiple || 2003–2021 || 09 Nov 2021 || 30 || align=left | Disc.: SDSS || 
|- id="2003 SQ372" bgcolor=#d6d6d6
| 3 ||  || MBA-O || 17.8 || 1.5 km || multiple || 2003–2019 || 26 Sep 2019 || 16 || align=left | Disc.: SDSS || 
|- id="2003 SR372" bgcolor=#E9E9E9
| 0 ||  || MBA-M || 17.86 || 1.1 km || multiple || 2003–2021 || 26 Nov 2021 || 62 || align=left | Disc.: SDSSAlt.: 2016 QK59 || 
|- id="2003 SW372" bgcolor=#fefefe
| 0 ||  || MBA-I || 18.5 || data-sort-value="0.59" | 590 m || multiple || 2003–2020 || 26 Jan 2020 || 40 || align=left | Disc.: SDSS || 
|- id="2003 SX372" bgcolor=#E9E9E9
| – ||  || MBA-M || 20.0 || data-sort-value="0.42" | 420 m || single || 3 days || 29 Sep 2003 || 6 || align=left | Disc.: SDSS || 
|- id="2003 SA373" bgcolor=#d6d6d6
| 0 ||  || MBA-O || 17.54 || 1.7 km || multiple || 2003–2021 || 30 Jun 2021 || 69 || align=left | Disc.: SDSSAlt.: 2008 UF44, 2015 BR171 || 
|- id="2003 SE373" bgcolor=#fefefe
| 1 ||  || MBA-I || 19.11 || data-sort-value="0.45" | 450 m || multiple || 2003–2021 || 11 Jun 2021 || 50 || align=left | Disc.: SDSSAlt.: 2014 QY339 || 
|- id="2003 SF373" bgcolor=#fefefe
| 0 ||  || MBA-I || 18.3 || data-sort-value="0.65" | 650 m || multiple || 2002–2020 || 26 Mar 2020 || 53 || align=left | Disc.: SDSSAlt.: 2014 UJ111 || 
|- id="2003 SH373" bgcolor=#d6d6d6
| 0 ||  || MBA-O || 17.1 || 2.1 km || multiple || 2003–2019 || 25 Sep 2019 || 55 || align=left | Disc.: SDSS || 
|- id="2003 SJ373" bgcolor=#FA8072
| 2 ||  || MCA || 19.4 || data-sort-value="0.39" | 390 m || multiple || 2003–2020 || 15 Oct 2020 || 64 || align=left | Disc.: SDSSAdded on 19 October 2020 || 
|- id="2003 SM373" bgcolor=#E9E9E9
| 1 ||  || MBA-M || 18.7 || data-sort-value="0.76" | 760 m || multiple || 2003–2020 || 12 Sep 2020 || 25 || align=left | Disc.: SDSSAdded on 17 January 2021 || 
|- id="2003 SN373" bgcolor=#d6d6d6
| 0 ||  || MBA-O || 16.80 || 2.4 km || multiple || 2003–2021 || 29 Nov 2021 || 89 || align=left | Disc.: SDSSAlt.: 2014 QR297 || 
|- id="2003 SS373" bgcolor=#d6d6d6
| 0 ||  || MBA-O || 17.5 || 1.8 km || multiple || 2003–2020 || 05 Dec 2020 || 57 || align=left | Disc.: SDSS || 
|- id="2003 SU373" bgcolor=#fefefe
| 1 ||  || MBA-I || 18.5 || data-sort-value="0.59" | 590 m || multiple || 2003–2020 || 23 Mar 2020 || 52 || align=left | Disc.: SDSSAlt.: 2016 BW43 || 
|- id="2003 SV373" bgcolor=#d6d6d6
| – ||  || MBA-O || 18.5 || 1.1 km || single || 3 days || 29 Sep 2003 || 6 || align=left | Disc.: SDSS || 
|- id="2003 SW373" bgcolor=#fefefe
| 0 ||  || MBA-I || 19.0 || data-sort-value="0.47" | 470 m || multiple || 2002–2021 || 09 Oct 2021 || 66 || align=left | Disc.: SDSSAlt.: 2017 OG128 || 
|- id="2003 SX373" bgcolor=#fefefe
| 0 ||  || MBA-I || 19.5 || data-sort-value="0.37" | 370 m || multiple || 2003–2020 || 16 Nov 2020 || 40 || align=left | Disc.: SDSSAdded on 30 September 2021Alt.: 2013 PU111 || 
|- id="2003 SY373" bgcolor=#d6d6d6
| 1 ||  || MBA-O || 17.5 || 1.8 km || multiple || 2003–2020 || 09 Dec 2020 || 55 || align=left | Disc.: SDSSAlt.: 2010 CR212 || 
|- id="2003 SZ373" bgcolor=#d6d6d6
| 0 ||  || MBA-O || 17.3 || 1.9 km || multiple || 2003–2019 || 29 Oct 2019 || 39 || align=left | Disc.: SDSS || 
|- id="2003 SB374" bgcolor=#fefefe
| 2 ||  || MBA-I || 19.3 || data-sort-value="0.41" | 410 m || multiple || 2003–2019 || 23 Oct 2019 || 38 || align=left | Disc.: SDSS || 
|- id="2003 SC374" bgcolor=#d6d6d6
| 2 ||  || MBA-O || 18.0 || 1.4 km || multiple || 2003–2019 || 01 Oct 2019 || 33 || align=left | Disc.: SDSS || 
|- id="2003 SE374" bgcolor=#E9E9E9
| 2 ||  || MBA-M || 18.3 || 1.2 km || multiple || 2003–2021 || 06 Nov 2021 || 35 || align=left | Disc.: SDSS || 
|- id="2003 SG374" bgcolor=#fefefe
| 2 ||  || MBA-I || 20.1 || data-sort-value="0.28" | 280 m || multiple || 2003–2021 || 11 Nov 2021 || 41 || align=left | Disc.: SDSS || 
|- id="2003 SP374" bgcolor=#d6d6d6
| – ||  || MBA-O || 17.2 || 2.0 km || single || 3 days || 29 Sep 2003 || 7 || align=left | Disc.: SDSS || 
|- id="2003 SQ374" bgcolor=#fefefe
| 0 ||  || MBA-I || 18.97 || data-sort-value="0.48" | 480 m || multiple || 2003–2022 || 06 Jan 2022 || 57 || align=left | Disc.: SDSS || 
|- id="2003 SW374" bgcolor=#fefefe
| – ||  || MBA-I || 19.2 || data-sort-value="0.43" | 430 m || single || 28 days || 24 Oct 2003 || 8 || align=left | Disc.: SDSS || 
|- id="2003 SX374" bgcolor=#E9E9E9
| 0 ||  || MBA-M || 17.84 || 1.1 km || multiple || 2003–2022 || 26 Jan 2022 || 56 || align=left | Disc.: SDSSAlt.: 2014 DC84 || 
|- id="2003 SC375" bgcolor=#fefefe
| 2 ||  || MBA-I || 20.0 || data-sort-value="0.30" | 300 m || multiple || 2003–2020 || 17 Nov 2020 || 23 || align=left | Disc.: SDSSAdded on 11 May 2021Alt.: 2020 TP33 || 
|- id="2003 SJ375" bgcolor=#fefefe
| 2 ||  || MBA-I || 19.70 || data-sort-value="0.34" | 340 m || multiple || 2003–2021 || 17 May 2021 || 25 || align=left | Disc.: SDSS || 
|- id="2003 SK375" bgcolor=#d6d6d6
| 0 ||  || MBA-O || 17.2 || 2.0 km || multiple || 1998–2019 || 04 Sep 2019 || 186 || align=left | Disc.: SDSSAlt.: 2014 WS72 || 
|- id="2003 SL375" bgcolor=#d6d6d6
| 0 ||  || MBA-O || 17.3 || 1.9 km || multiple || 1998–2021 || 04 Jan 2021 || 73 || align=left | Disc.: SDSSAlt.: 2016 BL21 || 
|- id="2003 SP375" bgcolor=#d6d6d6
| – ||  || MBA-O || 18.3 || 1.2 km || single || 3 days || 29 Sep 2003 || 6 || align=left | Disc.: SDSS || 
|- id="2003 ST375" bgcolor=#E9E9E9
| 0 ||  || MBA-M || 17.54 || 1.7 km || multiple || 2001–2021 || 08 Sep 2021 || 73 || align=left | Disc.: SDSS || 
|- id="2003 SY375" bgcolor=#fefefe
| 0 ||  || MBA-I || 19.21 || data-sort-value="0.43" | 430 m || multiple || 2003–2021 || 07 Apr 2021 || 103 || align=left | Disc.: SDSS || 
|- id="2003 SZ375" bgcolor=#E9E9E9
| 0 ||  || MBA-M || 18.27 || data-sort-value="0.93" | 930 m || multiple || 2003–2022 || 04 Jan 2022 || 46 || align=left | Disc.: SDSS || 
|- id="2003 SA376" bgcolor=#d6d6d6
| 0 ||  || MBA-O || 16.2 || 3.2 km || multiple || 2001–2021 || 14 Jan 2021 || 197 || align=left | Disc.: SDSSAlt.: 2014 WX328 || 
|- id="2003 SB376" bgcolor=#E9E9E9
| 1 ||  || MBA-M || 18.20 || 1.3 km || multiple || 2003–2021 || 30 Sep 2021 || 42 || align=left | Disc.: SDSSAlt.: 2012 SG36 || 
|- id="2003 SD376" bgcolor=#E9E9E9
| – ||  || MBA-M || 20.1 || data-sort-value="0.40" | 400 m || single || 3 days || 29 Sep 2003 || 6 || align=left | Disc.: SDSS || 
|- id="2003 SF376" bgcolor=#d6d6d6
| 0 ||  || MBA-O || 16.9 || 2.3 km || multiple || 2003–2021 || 17 Jan 2021 || 61 || align=left | Disc.: SDSSAlt.: 2016 AO114 || 
|- id="2003 SG376" bgcolor=#d6d6d6
| 0 ||  || MBA-O || 17.78 || 1.5 km || multiple || 2003–2021 || 12 Jun 2021 || 53 || align=left | Disc.: SDSSAdded on 22 July 2020 || 
|- id="2003 SL376" bgcolor=#d6d6d6
| 0 ||  || MBA-O || 17.09 || 2.1 km || multiple || 2003–2021 || 26 Nov 2021 || 51 || align=left | Disc.: SDSSAdded on 17 January 2021Alt.: 2009 SN36, 2009 SU365 || 
|- id="2003 SM376" bgcolor=#E9E9E9
| 0 ||  || MBA-M || 17.70 || 1.2 km || multiple || 2003–2021 || 24 Nov 2021 || 74 || align=left | Disc.: SDSS || 
|- id="2003 SN376" bgcolor=#d6d6d6
| 2 ||  || MBA-O || 17.7 || 1.6 km || multiple || 2003–2021 || 15 Apr 2021 || 25 || align=left | Disc.: SDSSAdded on 21 August 2021 || 
|- id="2003 SQ376" bgcolor=#d6d6d6
| 0 ||  || MBA-O || 17.5 || 1.8 km || multiple || 2003–2019 || 26 Sep 2019 || 39 || align=left | Disc.: SDSSAlt.: 2018 LQ8 || 
|- id="2003 SS376" bgcolor=#E9E9E9
| 0 ||  || MBA-M || 18.1 || 1.0 km || multiple || 2003–2018 || 07 Mar 2018 || 23 || align=left | Disc.: SDSS || 
|- id="2003 SU376" bgcolor=#d6d6d6
| 0 ||  || MBA-O || 17.0 || 2.2 km || multiple || 2003–2019 || 08 Oct 2019 || 46 || align=left | Disc.: SDSS || 
|- id="2003 SY376" bgcolor=#d6d6d6
| – ||  || MBA-O || 18.6 || 1.1 km || single || 3 days || 29 Sep 2003 || 6 || align=left | Disc.: SDSS || 
|- id="2003 SE377" bgcolor=#fefefe
| 0 ||  || MBA-I || 18.2 || data-sort-value="0.68" | 680 m || multiple || 2003–2021 || 08 Jan 2021 || 141 || align=left | Disc.: SDSSAlt.: 2010 XR83, 2013 SX10 || 
|- id="2003 SJ377" bgcolor=#fefefe
| 2 ||  || MBA-I || 18.9 || data-sort-value="0.49" | 490 m || multiple || 1996–2020 || 15 Aug 2020 || 35 || align=left | Disc.: SDSSAdded on 19 October 2020Alt.: 2010 TC108 || 
|- id="2003 SO377" bgcolor=#fefefe
| 0 ||  || MBA-I || 19.3 || data-sort-value="0.41" | 410 m || multiple || 2003–2021 || 14 Apr 2021 || 25 || align=left | Disc.: SDSSAlt.: 2014 NW7 || 
|- id="2003 SP377" bgcolor=#fefefe
| 5 ||  || MBA-I || 19.6 || data-sort-value="0.36" | 360 m || multiple || 2003–2014 || 24 Apr 2014 || 11 || align=left | Disc.: SDSS || 
|- id="2003 SX377" bgcolor=#E9E9E9
| 1 ||  || MBA-M || 18.4 || data-sort-value="0.62" | 620 m || multiple || 2003–2019 || 26 Sep 2019 || 32 || align=left | Disc.: SDSS || 
|- id="2003 SY377" bgcolor=#d6d6d6
| 0 ||  || MBA-O || 17.1 || 2.1 km || multiple || 2003–2020 || 07 Dec 2020 || 91 || align=left | Disc.: SDSS || 
|- id="2003 SF378" bgcolor=#E9E9E9
| 1 ||  || MBA-M || 17.95 || 1.4 km || multiple || 2003–2021 || 03 Oct 2021 || 53 || align=left | Disc.: SDSS || 
|- id="2003 SG378" bgcolor=#E9E9E9
| 0 ||  || MBA-M || 17.80 || 1.2 km || multiple || 2003–2021 || 02 Dec 2021 || 77 || align=left | Disc.: SDSSAdded on 24 December 2021 || 
|- id="2003 SH378" bgcolor=#d6d6d6
| 0 ||  || MBA-O || 17.4 || 1.8 km || multiple || 2003–2021 || 18 Jan 2021 || 98 || align=left | Disc.: SDSSAlt.: 2005 AF74, 2010 EM26 || 
|- id="2003 SK378" bgcolor=#d6d6d6
| 0 ||  || MBA-O || 17.6 || 1.7 km || multiple || 2003–2021 || 14 May 2021 || 34 || align=left | Disc.: SDSSAdded on 17 June 2021 || 
|- id="2003 SL378" bgcolor=#E9E9E9
| 2 ||  || MBA-M || 18.8 || data-sort-value="0.52" | 520 m || multiple || 2003–2019 || 03 Oct 2019 || 43 || align=left | Disc.: SDSS || 
|- id="2003 SM378" bgcolor=#d6d6d6
| 0 ||  || MBA-O || 17.1 || 2.1 km || multiple || 2003–2020 || 21 Jan 2020 || 80 || align=left | Disc.: SDSSAlt.: 2013 PW47 || 
|- id="2003 SP378" bgcolor=#d6d6d6
| 3 ||  || MBA-O || 18.1 || 1.3 km || multiple || 2003–2020 || 23 Oct 2020 || 16 || align=left | Disc.: SDSSAdded on 17 January 2021 || 
|- id="2003 SQ378" bgcolor=#E9E9E9
| 0 ||  || MBA-M || 17.9 || 1.5 km || multiple || 2003–2021 || 04 Oct 2021 || 102 || align=left | Disc.: SDSS || 
|- id="2003 SS378" bgcolor=#E9E9E9
| 0 ||  || MBA-M || 18.32 || 1.2 km || multiple || 2003–2021 || 30 Nov 2021 || 73 || align=left | Disc.: SDSSAlt.: 2012 TC70 || 
|- id="2003 SU378" bgcolor=#fefefe
| – ||  || MBA-I || 20.1 || data-sort-value="0.28" | 280 m || single || 3 days || 29 Sep 2003 || 6 || align=left | Disc.: SDSS || 
|- id="2003 SV378" bgcolor=#E9E9E9
| 0 ||  || MBA-M || 17.63 || 1.7 km || multiple || 2002–2021 || 02 Oct 2021 || 96 || align=left | Disc.: SDSSAdded on 22 July 2020 || 
|- id="2003 SX378" bgcolor=#d6d6d6
| 0 ||  || MBA-O || 17.8 || 1.5 km || multiple || 2003–2017 || 15 Sep 2017 || 35 || align=left | Disc.: SDSSAdded on 21 August 2021Alt.: 2003 UV316, 2008 UV238 || 
|- id="2003 SZ378" bgcolor=#d6d6d6
| 0 ||  || MBA-O || 17.86 || 1.5 km || multiple || 2003–2022 || 25 Jan 2022 || 35 || align=left | Disc.: SDSSAdded on 17 January 2021 || 
|- id="2003 SD379" bgcolor=#d6d6d6
| 0 ||  || MBA-O || 17.16 || 2.1 km || multiple || 2003–2022 || 26 Jan 2022 || 60 || align=left | Disc.: SDSS || 
|- id="2003 SF379" bgcolor=#d6d6d6
| 0 ||  || MBA-O || 16.9 || 2.3 km || multiple || 2003–2019 || 30 Jun 2019 || 35 || align=left | Disc.: SDSSAlt.: 2014 SP146 || 
|- id="2003 SM379" bgcolor=#d6d6d6
| 0 ||  || MBA-O || 16.8 || 2.4 km || multiple || 2003–2020 || 16 Sep 2020 || 72 || align=left | Disc.: SDSSAlt.: 2012 GX40, 2014 QH489 || 
|- id="2003 SO379" bgcolor=#d6d6d6
| – ||  || MBA-O || 18.6 || 1.1 km || single || 23 days || 19 Oct 2003 || 7 || align=left | Disc.: SDSS || 
|- id="2003 SP379" bgcolor=#fefefe
| 0 ||  || MBA-I || 19.00 || data-sort-value="0.47" | 470 m || multiple || 2003–2021 || 11 Sep 2021 || 49 || align=left | Disc.: SDSSAdded on 21 August 2021 || 
|- id="2003 SV379" bgcolor=#fefefe
| 0 ||  || MBA-I || 19.1 || data-sort-value="0.45" | 450 m || multiple || 2003–2020 || 22 Apr 2020 || 36 || align=left | Disc.: SDSSAdded on 22 July 2020 || 
|- id="2003 SW379" bgcolor=#d6d6d6
| 0 ||  || MBA-O || 16.9 || 2.3 km || multiple || 2003–2020 || 07 Dec 2020 || 74 || align=left | Disc.: SDSSAlt.: 2003 UM346, 2014 SU121 || 
|- id="2003 SZ379" bgcolor=#fefefe
| 0 ||  || MBA-I || 18.8 || data-sort-value="0.52" | 520 m || multiple || 2003–2019 || 22 Aug 2019 || 27 || align=left | Disc.: SDSSAdded on 22 July 2020 || 
|- id="2003 SC380" bgcolor=#E9E9E9
| 0 ||  || MBA-M || 18.08 || 1.3 km || multiple || 2003–2021 || 02 Dec 2021 || 82 || align=left | Disc.: SDSSAlt.: 2003 SZ422 || 
|- id="2003 SF380" bgcolor=#fefefe
| 0 ||  || MBA-I || 18.3 || data-sort-value="0.65" | 650 m || multiple || 2003–2020 || 16 Nov 2020 || 124 || align=left | Disc.: SDSSAlt.: 2009 HP78, 2013 NB17 || 
|- id="2003 SH380" bgcolor=#E9E9E9
| 0 ||  || MBA-M || 17.8 || data-sort-value="0.82" | 820 m || multiple || 2003–2021 || 18 Jan 2021 || 104 || align=left | Disc.: SDSSAlt.: 2014 HX11 || 
|- id="2003 SN380" bgcolor=#d6d6d6
| 0 ||  || MBA-O || 17.3 || 1.9 km || multiple || 1998–2021 || 10 Apr 2021 || 49 || align=left | Disc.: SDSSAdded on 11 May 2021 || 
|- id="2003 SP380" bgcolor=#d6d6d6
| 0 ||  || MBA-O || 16.9 || 2.3 km || multiple || 2003–2019 || 27 Oct 2019 || 48 || align=left | Disc.: SDSS || 
|- id="2003 ST380" bgcolor=#E9E9E9
| 0 ||  || MBA-M || 17.95 || 1.4 km || multiple || 2003–2021 || 08 Sep 2021 || 52 || align=left | Disc.: SDSS || 
|- id="2003 SV380" bgcolor=#fefefe
| – ||  || MBA-I || 20.1 || data-sort-value="0.28" | 280 m || single || 3 days || 29 Sep 2003 || 6 || align=left | Disc.: SDSS || 
|- id="2003 SW380" bgcolor=#E9E9E9
| 0 ||  || MBA-M || 17.9 || 1.5 km || multiple || 2003–2021 || 09 Nov 2021 || 40 || align=left | Disc.: SDSSAdded on 29 January 2022 || 
|- id="2003 SX380" bgcolor=#E9E9E9
| 0 ||  || MBA-M || 17.86 || 1.1 km || multiple || 2003–2021 || 30 Nov 2021 || 56 || align=left | Disc.: SDSSAdded on 19 October 2020 || 
|- id="2003 SY380" bgcolor=#d6d6d6
| 0 ||  || MBA-O || 17.55 || 1.7 km || multiple || 2003–2021 || 10 Apr 2021 || 52 || align=left | Disc.: SDSSAdded on 22 July 2020 || 
|- id="2003 SZ380" bgcolor=#E9E9E9
| 0 ||  || MBA-M || 17.9 || 1.5 km || multiple || 2003–2021 || 03 Oct 2021 || 52 || align=left | Disc.: SDSSAdded on 30 September 2021Alt.: 2013 YF132 || 
|- id="2003 SC381" bgcolor=#E9E9E9
| 1 ||  || MBA-M || 18.1 || 1.3 km || multiple || 2003–2021 || 10 Aug 2021 || 21 || align=left | Disc.: SDSSAdded on 21 August 2021 || 
|- id="2003 SD381" bgcolor=#d6d6d6
| 1 ||  || MBA-O || 17.6 || 1.7 km || multiple || 2003–2016 || 03 Apr 2016 || 34 || align=left | Disc.: SDSS || 
|- id="2003 SN381" bgcolor=#E9E9E9
| – ||  || MBA-M || 19.0 || data-sort-value="0.47" | 470 m || single || 3 days || 29 Sep 2003 || 7 || align=left | Disc.: SDSS || 
|- id="2003 SO381" bgcolor=#d6d6d6
| 1 ||  || MBA-O || 17.5 || 1.8 km || multiple || 2003–2019 || 24 Nov 2019 || 39 || align=left | Disc.: SDSSAlt.: 2014 XR23 || 
|- id="2003 SP381" bgcolor=#fefefe
| 0 ||  || MBA-I || 17.83 || data-sort-value="0.81" | 810 m || multiple || 2003–2021 || 15 Apr 2021 || 90 || align=left | Disc.: SDSS || 
|- id="2003 ST381" bgcolor=#E9E9E9
| 0 ||  || MBA-M || 17.7 || data-sort-value="0.86" | 860 m || multiple || 2003–2019 || 29 Sep 2019 || 43 || align=left | Disc.: SDSS || 
|- id="2003 SU381" bgcolor=#fefefe
| 0 ||  || MBA-I || 18.00 || data-sort-value="0.75" | 750 m || multiple || 2003–2021 || 04 Sep 2021 || 78 || align=left | Disc.: SDSS || 
|- id="2003 SV381" bgcolor=#d6d6d6
| 0 ||  || MBA-O || 16.7 || 2.5 km || multiple || 2003–2018 || 15 Jun 2018 || 42 || align=left | Disc.: SDSS || 
|- id="2003 SX381" bgcolor=#E9E9E9
| 0 ||  || MBA-M || 18.09 || 1.0 km || multiple || 2003–2021 || 29 Nov 2021 || 66 || align=left | Disc.: SDSS || 
|- id="2003 SD382" bgcolor=#d6d6d6
| 0 ||  || MBA-O || 17.1 || 2.1 km || multiple || 2003–2018 || 15 Sep 2018 || 71 || align=left | Disc.: SDSS || 
|- id="2003 SF382" bgcolor=#E9E9E9
| 0 ||  || MBA-M || 18.18 || 1.3 km || multiple || 2003–2021 || 29 Oct 2021 || 44 || align=left | Disc.: SDSSAdded on 30 September 2021Alt.: 2003 SB415 || 
|- id="2003 SG382" bgcolor=#E9E9E9
| 3 ||  || MBA-M || 19.4 || data-sort-value="0.55" | 550 m || multiple || 2003–2020 || 19 Nov 2020 || 22 || align=left | Disc.: SDSS || 
|- id="2003 SQ382" bgcolor=#fefefe
| 0 ||  || MBA-I || 18.34 || data-sort-value="0.64" | 640 m || multiple || 2003–2021 || 09 Sep 2021 || 66 || align=left | Disc.: SDSSAlt.: 2014 QB325 || 
|- id="2003 SR382" bgcolor=#d6d6d6
| 2 ||  || HIL || 16.6 || 2.7 km || multiple || 2003–2019 || 29 Oct 2019 || 45 || align=left | Disc.: SDSS || 
|- id="2003 SU382" bgcolor=#d6d6d6
| 0 ||  || MBA-O || 16.8 || 2.4 km || multiple || 2003–2020 || 12 Nov 2020 || 56 || align=left | Disc.: SDSSAdded on 17 January 2021 || 
|- id="2003 SV382" bgcolor=#E9E9E9
| 1 ||  || MBA-M || 18.16 || data-sort-value="0.98" | 980 m || multiple || 2003–2021 || 07 Nov 2021 || 40 || align=left | Disc.: SDSSAlt.: 2012 TP88 || 
|- id="2003 SW382" bgcolor=#E9E9E9
| 0 ||  || MBA-M || 17.9 || 1.1 km || multiple || 2001–2020 || 16 Nov 2020 || 54 || align=left | Disc.: SDSSAdded on 17 January 2021 || 
|- id="2003 SZ382" bgcolor=#fefefe
| 0 ||  || MBA-I || 18.87 || data-sort-value="0.50" | 500 m || multiple || 2003–2022 || 25 Jan 2022 || 78 || align=left | Disc.: SDSSAlt.: 2017 XU49 || 
|- id="2003 SB383" bgcolor=#d6d6d6
| 0 ||  || MBA-O || 17.05 || 2.2 km || multiple || 1998–2021 || 07 Jun 2021 || 130 || align=left | Disc.: SDSSAlt.: 2015 FY47 || 
|- id="2003 SC383" bgcolor=#E9E9E9
| 0 ||  || MBA-M || 17.76 || 1.6 km || multiple || 2003–2021 || 08 Sep 2021 || 50 || align=left | Disc.: SDSSAdded on 22 July 2020Alt.: 2008 US405 || 
|- id="2003 SE383" bgcolor=#d6d6d6
| 0 ||  || MBA-O || 16.6 || 2.7 km || multiple || 2000–2021 || 18 Jan 2021 || 136 || align=left | Disc.: SDSSAlt.: 2013 NX18 || 
|- id="2003 SF383" bgcolor=#d6d6d6
| 0 ||  || MBA-O || 17.3 || 1.9 km || multiple || 2003–2020 || 24 Mar 2020 || 74 || align=left | Disc.: SDSSAlt.: 2008 UW85, 2015 BD326 || 
|- id="2003 SJ383" bgcolor=#fefefe
| 2 ||  || MBA-I || 19.4 || data-sort-value="0.39" | 390 m || multiple || 2003–2021 || 30 Nov 2021 || 29 || align=left | Disc.: SDSS || 
|- id="2003 SK383" bgcolor=#d6d6d6
| 1 ||  || MBA-O || 18.0 || 1.4 km || multiple || 2003–2016 || 03 Apr 2016 || 33 || align=left | Disc.: SDSSAlt.: 2005 BP30 || 
|- id="2003 SN383" bgcolor=#d6d6d6
| 0 ||  || HIL || 16.8 || 2.4 km || multiple || 2003–2019 || 02 Nov 2019 || 52 || align=left | Disc.: SDSSAlt.: 2011 UU229 || 
|- id="2003 SO383" bgcolor=#E9E9E9
| 0 ||  || MBA-M || 18.1 || 1.0 km || multiple || 2003–2020 || 14 Sep 2020 || 26 || align=left | Disc.: SDSSAdded on 9 March 2021 || 
|- id="2003 SU383" bgcolor=#E9E9E9
| 0 ||  || MBA-M || 18.3 || data-sort-value="0.65" | 650 m || multiple || 2003–2021 || 16 Jan 2021 || 46 || align=left | Disc.: SDSS || 
|- id="2003 SV383" bgcolor=#E9E9E9
| 0 ||  || MBA-M || 18.1 || 1.0 km || multiple || 2003–2020 || 15 Oct 2020 || 43 || align=left | Disc.: SDSSAdded on 17 January 2021 || 
|- id="2003 SX383" bgcolor=#E9E9E9
| – ||  || MBA-M || 17.9 || data-sort-value="0.78" | 780 m || single || 27 days || 23 Oct 2003 || 12 || align=left | Disc.: SDSS || 
|- id="2003 SY383" bgcolor=#d6d6d6
| 0 ||  || MBA-O || 16.88 || 2.3 km || multiple || 2001–2022 || 23 Jan 2022 || 72 || align=left | Disc.: SDSS || 
|- id="2003 SA384" bgcolor=#d6d6d6
| 0 ||  || MBA-O || 17.26 || 2.0 km || multiple || 2003–2021 || 12 May 2021 || 84 || align=left | Disc.: SDSS || 
|- id="2003 SB384" bgcolor=#d6d6d6
| 0 ||  || HIL || 16.79 || 2.4 km || multiple || 2003–2021 || 18 Jan 2021 || 45 || align=left | Disc.: SDSSAdded on 11 May 2021Alt.: 2011 UG16 || 
|- id="2003 SD384" bgcolor=#fefefe
| 0 ||  || MBA-I || 18.8 || data-sort-value="0.52" | 520 m || multiple || 2003–2021 || 09 Jan 2021 || 52 || align=left | Disc.: SDSS || 
|- id="2003 SH384" bgcolor=#E9E9E9
| 0 ||  || MBA-M || 17.44 || 1.4 km || multiple || 2003–2021 || 05 Dec 2021 || 90 || align=left | Disc.: SDSSAlt.: 2015 GJ47, 2016 QT40 || 
|- id="2003 SR384" bgcolor=#E9E9E9
| 1 ||  || MBA-M || 18.4 || data-sort-value="0.88" | 880 m || multiple || 2003–2020 || 14 Nov 2020 || 30 || align=left | Disc.: SDSS || 
|- id="2003 SU384" bgcolor=#fefefe
| 1 ||  || MBA-I || 19.2 || data-sort-value="0.43" | 430 m || multiple || 2003–2019 || 28 Oct 2019 || 33 || align=left | Disc.: SDSSAdded on 17 January 2021Alt.: 2015 KT115 || 
|- id="2003 SV384" bgcolor=#fefefe
| 0 ||  || MBA-I || 18.82 || data-sort-value="0.51" | 510 m || multiple || 2003–2021 || 02 Dec 2021 || 69 || align=left | Disc.: SDSS || 
|- id="2003 SB385" bgcolor=#d6d6d6
| 2 ||  || MBA-O || 17.0 || 2.2 km || multiple || 2003–2019 || 03 Oct 2019 || 28 || align=left | Disc.: SDSS || 
|- id="2003 SC385" bgcolor=#E9E9E9
| 1 ||  || MBA-M || 18.0 || data-sort-value="0.75" | 750 m || multiple || 2003–2019 || 03 Oct 2019 || 47 || align=left | Disc.: SDSSAlt.: 2011 SM196, 2015 RK345 || 
|- id="2003 SD385" bgcolor=#d6d6d6
| 0 ||  || MBA-O || 17.55 || 1.7 km || multiple || 2003–2021 || 22 Apr 2021 || 62 || align=left | Disc.: SDSS || 
|- id="2003 SK385" bgcolor=#d6d6d6
| 0 ||  || MBA-O || 17.5 || 1.8 km || multiple || 2003–2020 || 23 Sep 2020 || 30 || align=left | Disc.: SDSSAdded on 17 January 2021Alt.: 2015 XO183 || 
|- id="2003 SM385" bgcolor=#d6d6d6
| 0 ||  || MBA-O || 17.2 || 2.0 km || multiple || 2003–2020 || 14 Feb 2020 || 80 || align=left | Disc.: SDSSAlt.: 2015 BO164 || 
|- id="2003 SP385" bgcolor=#E9E9E9
| 0 ||  || MBA-M || 18.56 || data-sort-value="0.82" | 820 m || multiple || 2003–2020 || 29 Jun 2020 || 26 || align=left | Disc.: SDSS || 
|- id="2003 SQ385" bgcolor=#fefefe
| 0 ||  || MBA-I || 18.75 || data-sort-value="0.53" | 530 m || multiple || 2003–2021 || 12 Sep 2021 || 91 || align=left | Disc.: SDSSAlt.: 2014 SK281 || 
|- id="2003 SR385" bgcolor=#d6d6d6
| 0 ||  || MBA-O || 16.8 || 2.4 km || multiple || 2003–2020 || 14 Oct 2020 || 67 || align=left | Disc.: SDSSAdded on 19 October 2020Alt.: 2015 XT144 || 
|- id="2003 ST385" bgcolor=#fefefe
| 0 ||  || MBA-I || 19.6 || data-sort-value="0.36" | 360 m || multiple || 2003–2021 || 12 Nov 2021 || 28 || align=left | Disc.: SDSS || 
|- id="2003 SW385" bgcolor=#E9E9E9
| 2 ||  || MBA-M || 18.9 || data-sort-value="0.70" | 700 m || multiple || 2003–2020 || 15 Oct 2020 || 71 || align=left | Disc.: SDSS || 
|- id="2003 SY385" bgcolor=#fefefe
| 0 ||  || MBA-I || 18.76 || data-sort-value="0.53" | 530 m || multiple || 2003–2021 || 03 Oct 2021 || 50 || align=left | Disc.: SDSSAlt.: 2013 JQ16 || 
|- id="2003 SZ385" bgcolor=#E9E9E9
| – ||  || MBA-M || 18.9 || data-sort-value="0.70" | 700 m || single || 6 days || 02 Oct 2003 || 7 || align=left | Disc.: SDSS || 
|- id="2003 SE386" bgcolor=#fefefe
| 0 ||  || MBA-I || 18.4 || data-sort-value="0.62" | 620 m || multiple || 2003–2017 || 27 Apr 2017 || 44 || align=left | Disc.: SDSSAlt.: 2006 JD25, 2014 SV176 || 
|- id="2003 SF386" bgcolor=#fefefe
| 0 ||  || MBA-I || 19.06 || data-sort-value="0.46" | 460 m || multiple || 2003–2021 || 02 Dec 2021 || 76 || align=left | Disc.: SDSS || 
|- id="2003 SG386" bgcolor=#E9E9E9
| 2 ||  || MBA-M || 18.6 || data-sort-value="0.80" | 800 m || multiple || 2003–2020 || 15 Sep 2020 || 17 || align=left | Disc.: SDSSAdded on 17 January 2021 || 
|- id="2003 SH386" bgcolor=#E9E9E9
| 0 ||  || MBA-M || 18.4 || data-sort-value="0.62" | 620 m || multiple || 2003–2020 || 16 Dec 2020 || 34 || align=left | Disc.: SDSSAlt.: 2007 RV159 || 
|- id="2003 SM386" bgcolor=#d6d6d6
| 0 ||  || MBA-O || 17.1 || 2.1 km || multiple || 2003–2019 || 25 Sep 2019 || 32 || align=left | Disc.: SDSS || 
|- id="2003 SN386" bgcolor=#fefefe
| 2 ||  || MBA-I || 19.4 || data-sort-value="0.39" | 390 m || multiple || 2003–2018 || 10 Oct 2018 || 20 || align=left | Disc.: SDSS || 
|- id="2003 SR386" bgcolor=#d6d6d6
| 1 ||  || MBA-O || 17.0 || 2.2 km || multiple || 2003–2020 || 05 Nov 2020 || 41 || align=left | Disc.: SDSSAlt.: 2010 BP146 || 
|- id="2003 ST386" bgcolor=#E9E9E9
| 0 ||  || MBA-M || 17.81 || 1.5 km || multiple || 2003–2021 || 10 Sep 2021 || 57 || align=left | Disc.: SDSS || 
|- id="2003 SU386" bgcolor=#E9E9E9
| 0 ||  || MBA-M || 17.6 || data-sort-value="0.90" | 900 m || multiple || 2003–2021 || 04 Jan 2021 || 67 || align=left | Disc.: SDSSAlt.: 2015 PB197 || 
|- id="2003 SY386" bgcolor=#E9E9E9
| 0 ||  || MBA-M || 17.9 || 1.1 km || multiple || 2003–2020 || 15 Oct 2020 || 43 || align=left | Disc.: SDSS || 
|- id="2003 SZ386" bgcolor=#d6d6d6
| 0 ||  || HIL || 15.92 || 3.6 km || multiple || 2003–2021 || 05 Feb 2021 || 116 || align=left | Disc.: SDSS || 
|- id="2003 SP387" bgcolor=#d6d6d6
| 0 ||  || MBA-O || 16.7 || 2.5 km || multiple || 2003–2021 || 22 Jan 2021 || 124 || align=left | Disc.: SDSSAlt.: 2014 WJ327, 2016 CY117 || 
|- id="2003 SQ387" bgcolor=#d6d6d6
| 0 ||  || MBA-O || 16.9 || 2.3 km || multiple || 2003–2019 || 28 Oct 2019 || 57 || align=left | Disc.: SDSS || 
|- id="2003 SR387" bgcolor=#d6d6d6
| 3 ||  || MBA-O || 17.7 || 1.6 km || multiple || 2003–2019 || 25 Oct 2019 || 20 || align=left | Disc.: SDSS || 
|- id="2003 SS387" bgcolor=#E9E9E9
| 1 ||  || MBA-M || 18.49 || data-sort-value="0.84" | 840 m || multiple || 2003–2021 || 30 Nov 2021 || 26 || align=left | Disc.: SDSSAdded on 19 October 2020 || 
|- id="2003 SW387" bgcolor=#E9E9E9
| 0 ||  || MBA-M || 18.1 || data-sort-value="0.71" | 710 m || multiple || 2003–2020 || 23 Nov 2020 || 53 || align=left | Disc.: SDSS || 
|- id="2003 SX387" bgcolor=#fefefe
| 0 ||  || MBA-I || 18.41 || data-sort-value="0.62" | 620 m || multiple || 2003–2021 || 07 Sep 2021 || 112 || align=left | Disc.: SDSSAdded on 22 July 2020 || 
|- id="2003 SY387" bgcolor=#d6d6d6
| 0 ||  || MBA-O || 17.1 || 2.1 km || multiple || 2003–2020 || 17 Nov 2020 || 45 || align=left | Disc.: SDSSAlt.: 2014 QA333 || 
|- id="2003 SZ387" bgcolor=#fefefe
| 0 ||  || MBA-I || 18.36 || data-sort-value="0.63" | 630 m || multiple || 2003–2021 || 06 Nov 2021 || 72 || align=left | Disc.: SDSS || 
|- id="2003 SA388" bgcolor=#E9E9E9
| 0 ||  || MBA-M || 18.2 || data-sort-value="0.96" | 960 m || multiple || 2003–2020 || 06 Dec 2020 || 44 || align=left | Disc.: SDSS || 
|- id="2003 SB388" bgcolor=#fefefe
| 0 ||  || MBA-I || 19.04 || data-sort-value="0.46" | 460 m || multiple || 2003–2021 || 25 Nov 2021 || 47 || align=left | Disc.: SDSSAdded on 21 August 2021 || 
|- id="2003 SD388" bgcolor=#fefefe
| 2 ||  || MBA-I || 19.7 || data-sort-value="0.34" | 340 m || multiple || 2003–2013 || 24 Nov 2013 || 21 || align=left | Disc.: SDSSAdded on 21 August 2021 || 
|- id="2003 SE388" bgcolor=#fefefe
| 2 ||  || MBA-I || 19.1 || data-sort-value="0.45" | 450 m || multiple || 2003–2018 || 07 Aug 2018 || 15 || align=left | Disc.: SDSSAdded on 21 August 2021 || 
|- id="2003 SG388" bgcolor=#d6d6d6
| 0 ||  || MBA-O || 17.0 || 2.2 km || multiple || 2003–2021 || 16 Jan 2021 || 86 || align=left | Disc.: SDSS || 
|- id="2003 SJ388" bgcolor=#fefefe
| 0 ||  || MBA-I || 17.9 || data-sort-value="0.78" | 780 m || multiple || 2003–2020 || 17 Dec 2020 || 74 || align=left | Disc.: SDSS || 
|- id="2003 SK388" bgcolor=#E9E9E9
| 0 ||  || MBA-M || 18.3 || data-sort-value="0.65" | 650 m || multiple || 2003–2019 || 25 Sep 2019 || 48 || align=left | Disc.: SDSSAlt.: 2014 HM96 || 
|- id="2003 SM388" bgcolor=#d6d6d6
| 0 ||  || MBA-O || 16.48 || 2.8 km || multiple || 2003–2021 || 09 Dec 2021 || 146 || align=left | Disc.: SDSSAlt.: 2009 SF187 || 
|- id="2003 SP388" bgcolor=#d6d6d6
| 0 ||  || MBA-O || 17.2 || 2.0 km || multiple || 2003–2021 || 06 Jan 2021 || 48 || align=left | Disc.: SDSSAdded on 19 October 2020 || 
|- id="2003 SR388" bgcolor=#fefefe
| 0 ||  || MBA-I || 18.29 || data-sort-value="0.65" | 650 m || multiple || 2002–2021 || 13 May 2021 || 94 || align=left | Disc.: SDSSAlt.: 2014 OU27 || 
|- id="2003 SW388" bgcolor=#E9E9E9
| 0 ||  || MBA-M || 17.82 || 1.1 km || multiple || 2003–2022 || 25 Jan 2022 || 89 || align=left | Disc.: SDSSAdded on 22 July 2020 || 
|- id="2003 SX388" bgcolor=#d6d6d6
| 0 ||  || MBA-O || 16.7 || 2.5 km || multiple || 2003–2020 || 14 Oct 2020 || 78 || align=left | Disc.: SDSSAlt.: 2014 OR284 || 
|- id="2003 SC389" bgcolor=#E9E9E9
| 0 ||  || MBA-M || 18.23 || data-sort-value="0.95" | 950 m || multiple || 2003–2022 || 07 Jan 2022 || 62 || align=left | Disc.: SDSSAdded on 19 October 2020 || 
|- id="2003 SR389" bgcolor=#d6d6d6
| 0 ||  || MBA-O || 17.2 || 2.0 km || multiple || 2001–2020 || 16 Nov 2020 || 51 || align=left | Disc.: SDSSAdded on 17 January 2021 || 
|- id="2003 SU389" bgcolor=#fefefe
| 0 ||  || MBA-I || 18.16 || data-sort-value="0.69" | 690 m || multiple || 2002–2021 || 02 Apr 2021 || 155 || align=left | Disc.: SDSSAlt.: 2015 KS124 || 
|- id="2003 SX389" bgcolor=#fefefe
| 0 ||  || MBA-I || 18.2 || data-sort-value="0.68" | 680 m || multiple || 2003–2020 || 24 Dec 2020 || 96 || align=left | Disc.: SDSSAlt.: 2015 FH266 || 
|- id="2003 SY389" bgcolor=#fefefe
| 0 ||  || MBA-I || 18.5 || data-sort-value="0.59" | 590 m || multiple || 2003–2021 || 18 Jan 2021 || 95 || align=left | Disc.: SDSSAlt.: 2008 CS81 || 
|}
back to top

References 
 

Lists of unnumbered minor planets